= Vila Velha =

- Municipality
- Municipality of Vila Velha
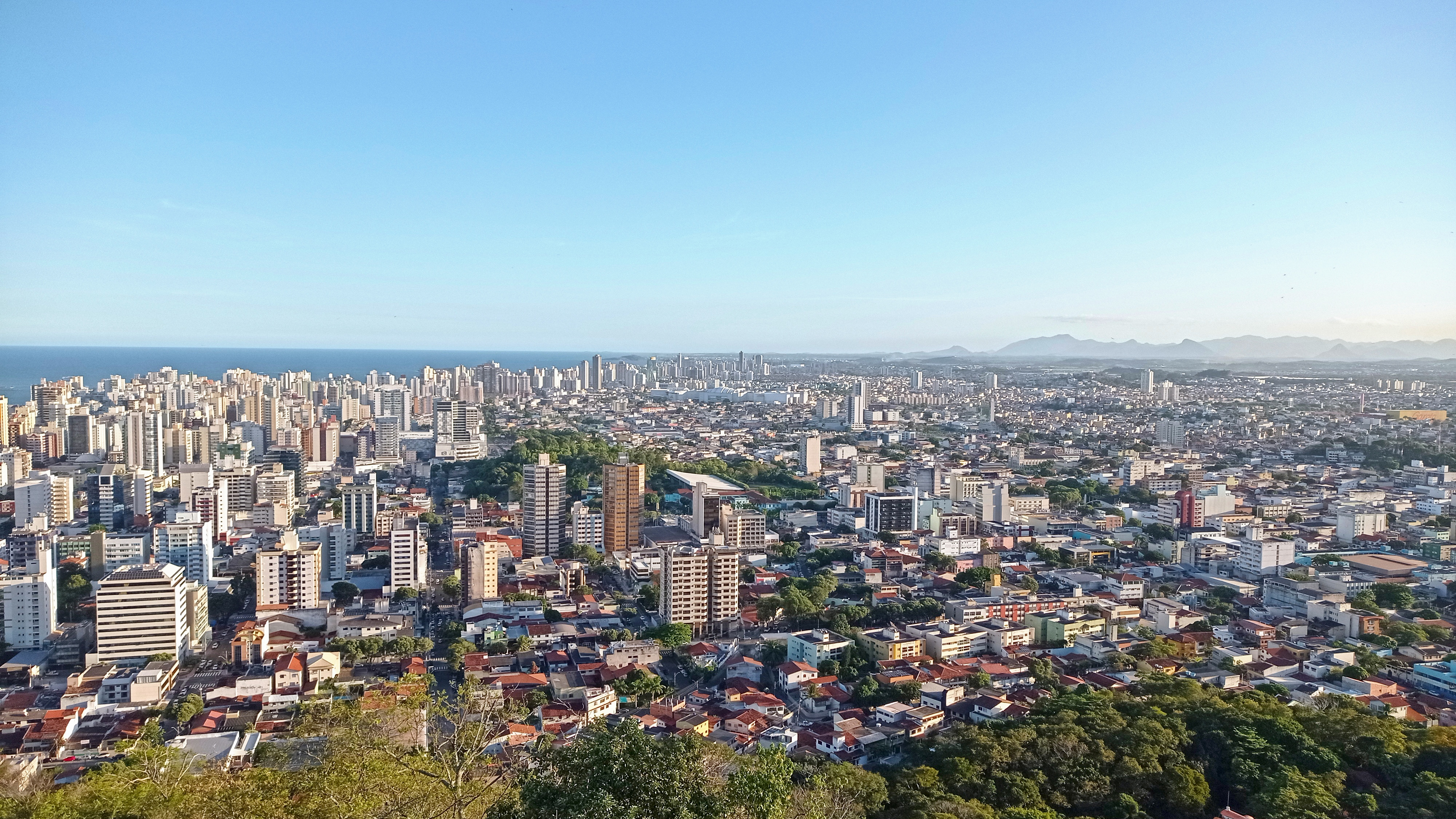
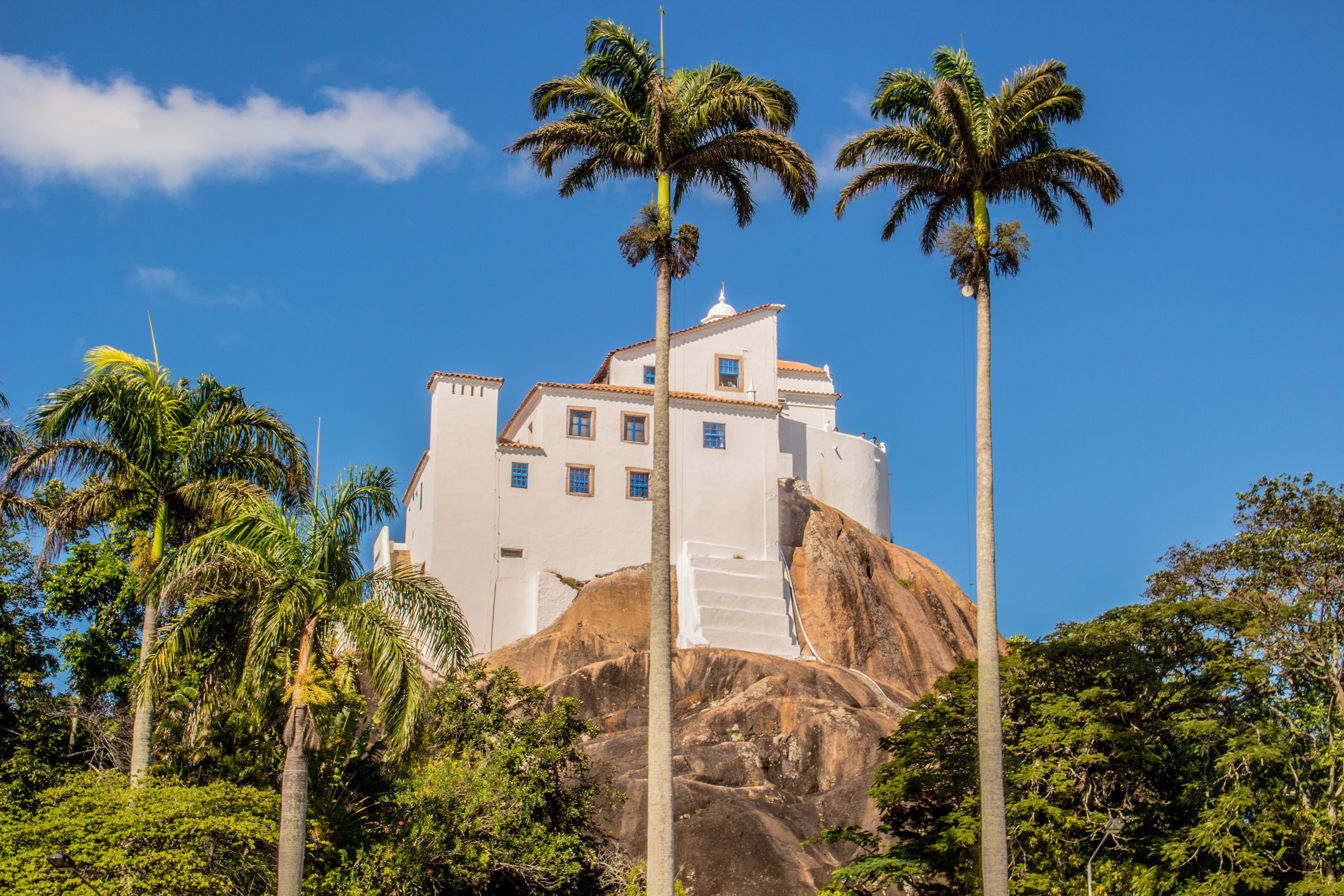
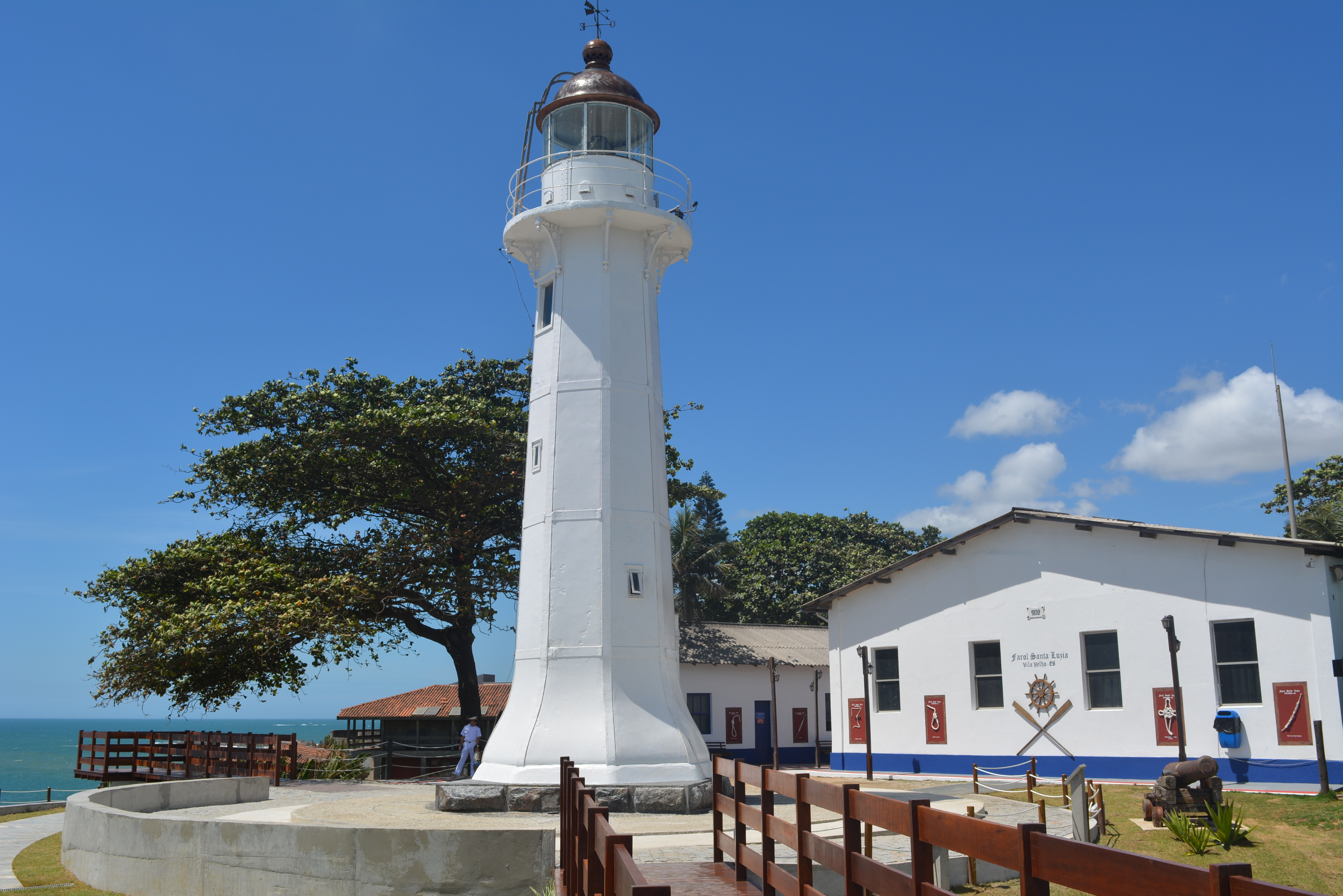
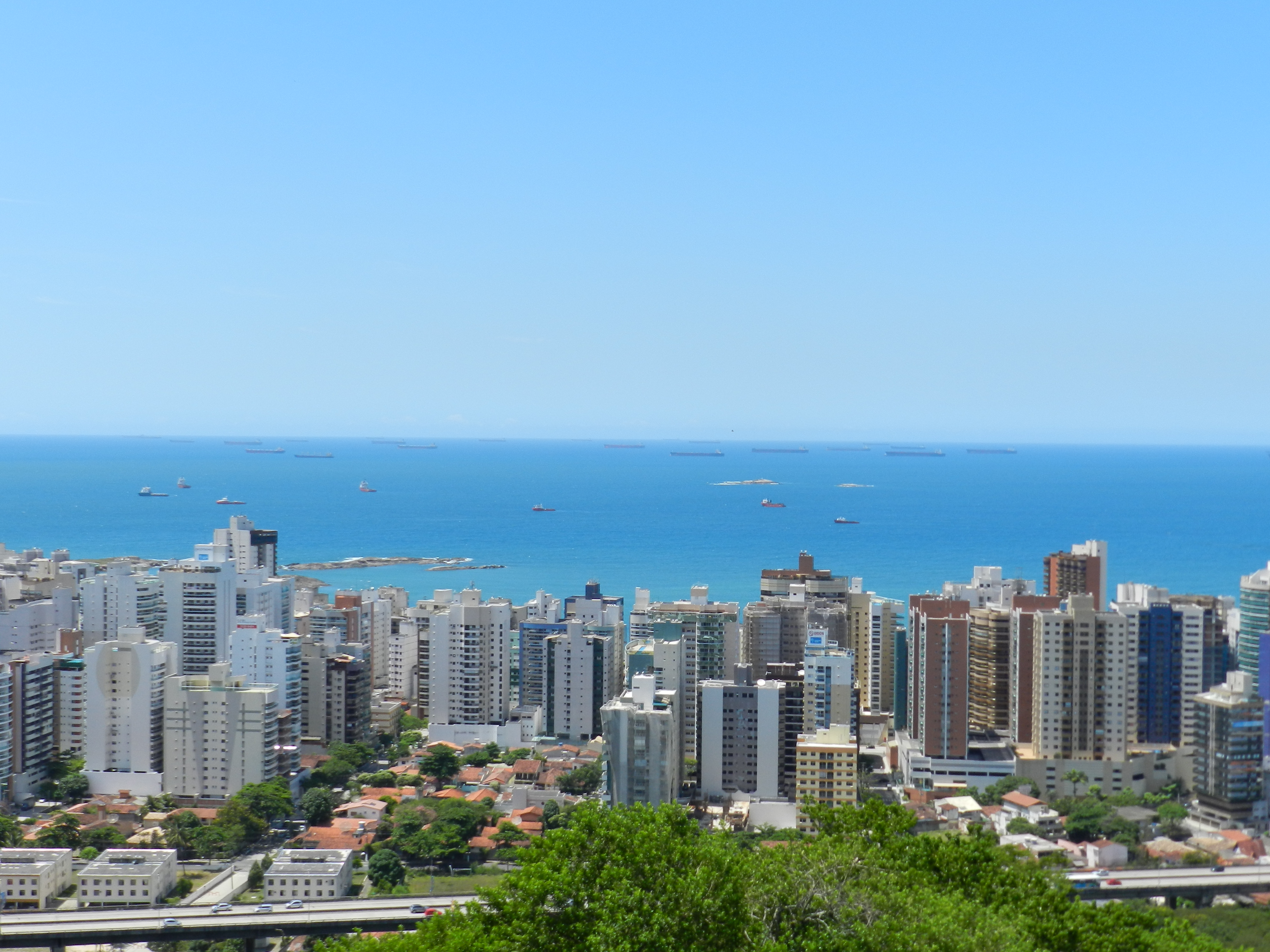
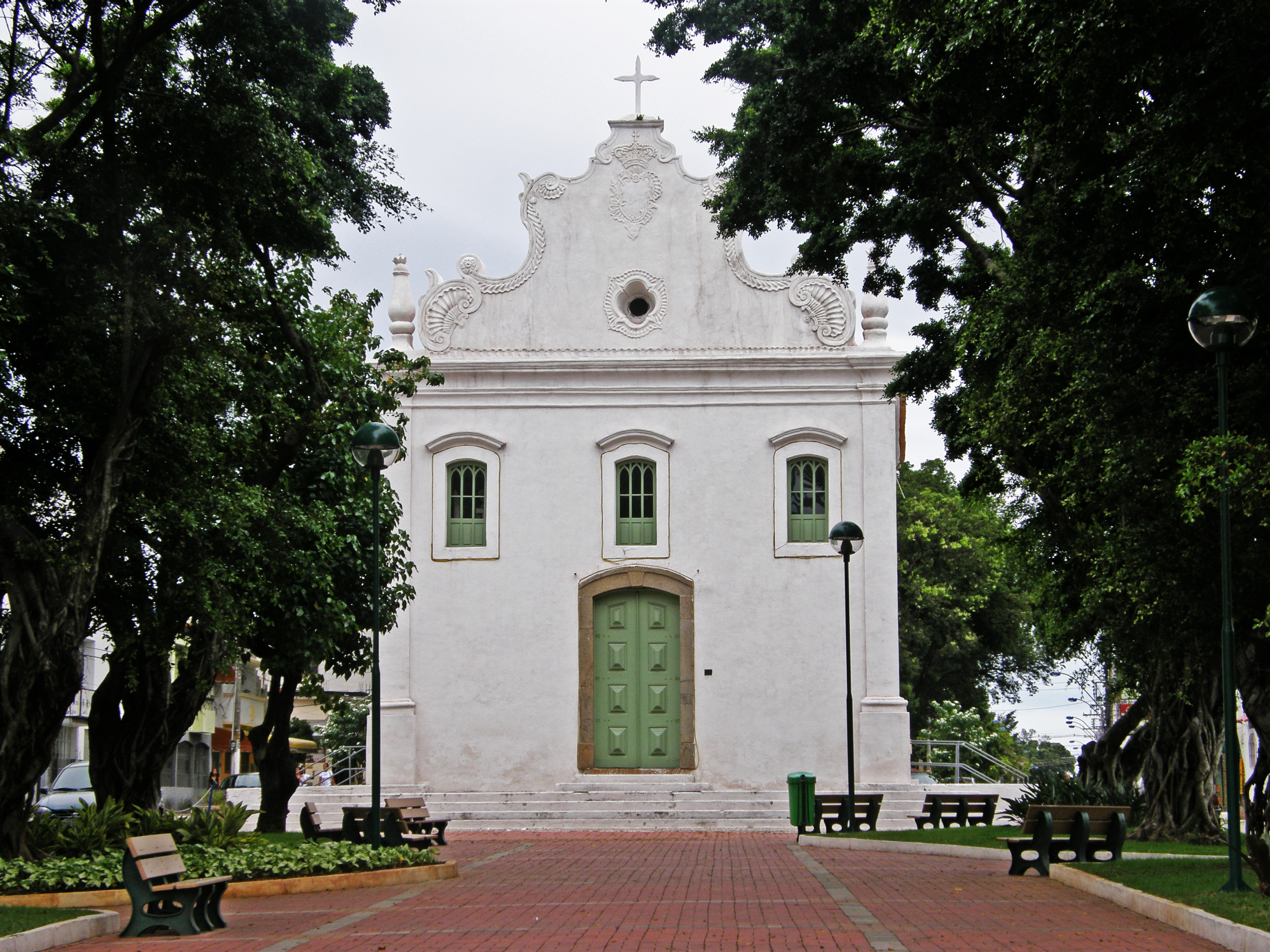
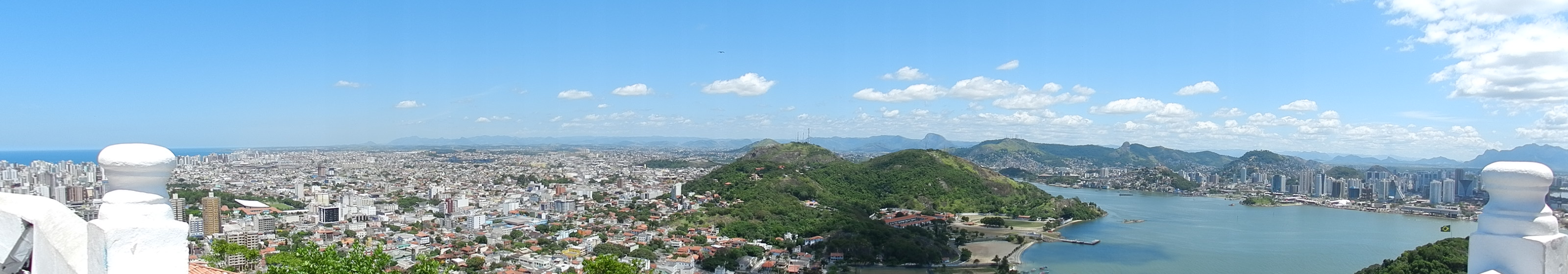

- Flag Coat of arms
- Nickname: The Land of the Green Shins (Portuguese: Terra dos Canelas-Verdes)
- Anthem: Anthem of the municipality of Vila Velha
- Location in Espírito Santo
- Coordinates: 20°20′11″S 40°17′37″W
- Country: Brazil
- Region: Southeast
- State: Espírito Santo
- Districts: Argolas, Ibes, Jucu, São Torquato and Vila Velha (seat)
- Founded: 23 May 1535

Government
  - Mayor: Arnaldinho Borgo (2025-2028) (Podemos)

Area
  - Municipality: 210 km^{2} (81 sq mi)
  - Urban: 54.57 km^{2} (21.07 sq mi)

Population (2022)
  - Municipality: 467,722
  - Estimate (2024): 502,899
  - Density: 2,200/km^{2} (5,800/sq mi)
- Demonym: Vila-velhense
- Time zone: UTC-3 (UTC−3)
- Postal Code: 29100-000
- Area code: +55 27
- HDI (2010): 0.800 – very high
- Website: vilavelha.es.gov.br

Vila Velha (Portuguese pronunciation: [ˈvilɐ ˈvɛʎɐ]; lit. 'Old Village') is a Brazilian municipality situated on the coast of the state of Espírito Santo, in the Southeast Region of Brazil. It is part of the Greater Vitória Metropolitan Area and covers an area of 209.965 km^{2} (81.068 sq mi), of which 54.57 km^{2} (21.07 sq mi) is within the urban area. According to estimates by the Brazilian Institute of Geography and Statistics (IBGE) in 2024, its population was 502,899 inhabitants, making it the second most populous municipality in Espírito Santo, surpassed only by Serra.

Founded on 23 May 1535 by the Portuguese Vasco Fernandes Coutinho, the grantee of the Captaincy of Espírito Santo, Vila Velha served as the captaincy’s capital until 1549, when the seat was transferred to Vitória. As the oldest city in the state, it is home to numerous historical landmarks, including the Church of Our Lady of the Rosary, the Fort of São Francisco Xavier de Piratininga, the Santa Luzia Lighthouse, and the Penha Convent. The latter, constructed between the 16th and 17th centuries, is one of Espírito Santo’s primary tourist attractions and was designated a national cultural heritage site by the National Institute of Historic and Artistic Heritage in 1943.

Today, Vila Velha is a significant industrial hub and the state’s second-largest commercial center, following the capital, Vitória. Its 32 km (20 mi) coastline is almost entirely lined with beaches, which are key tourist and scenic attractions, including Praia da Costa, Itapoã, and Itaparica. The city hosts several annual events that further boost tourism, such as the Festa da Penha, a tribute to Our Lady of Peñafrancia, considered Brazil’s third-largest religious event; the Chocolate Festival, showcasing the work of Chocolates Garoto, one of Vila Velha’s largest and oldest industries; and Jesus Vida Verão.

== History ==
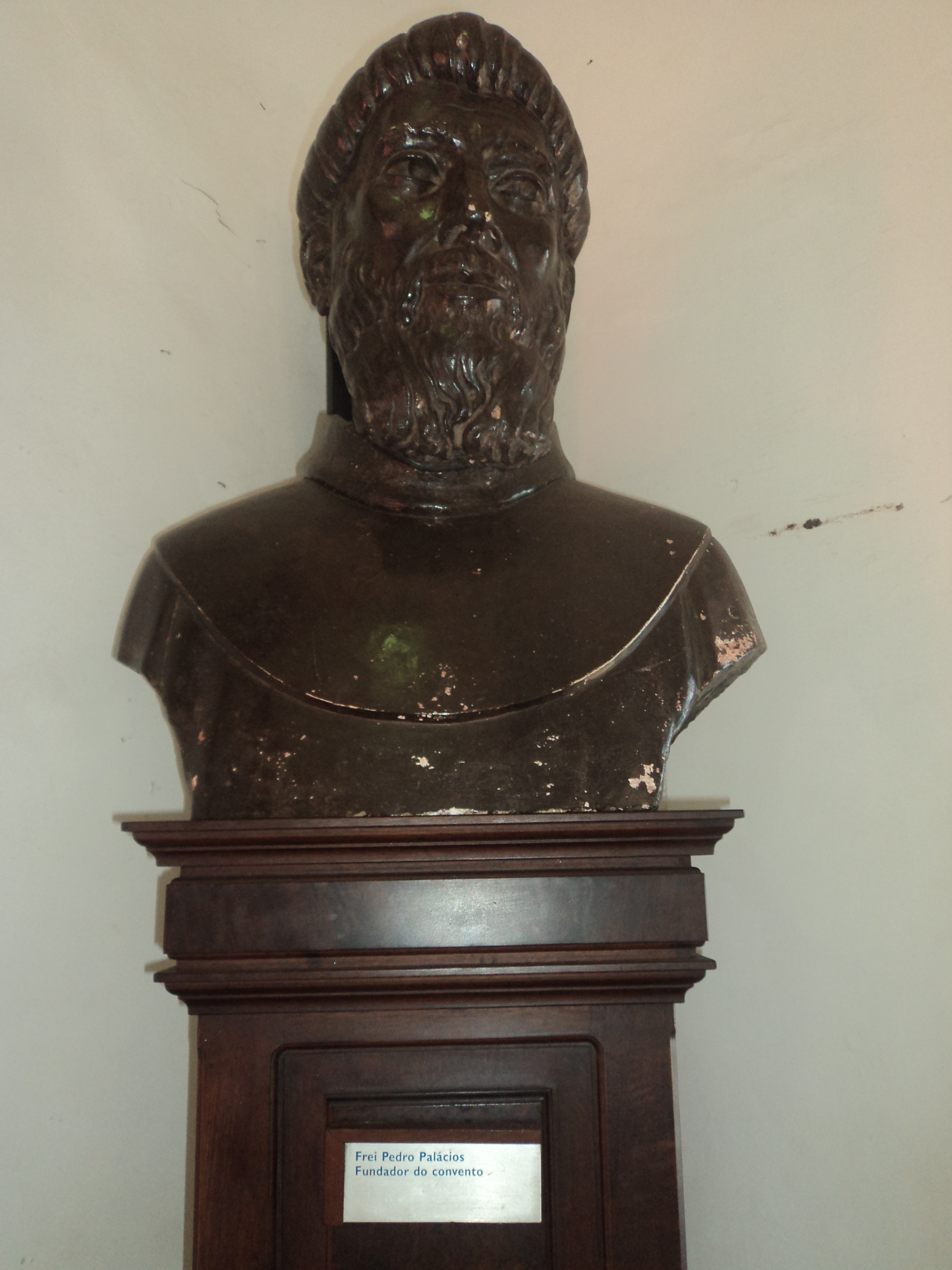
Bust of Friar Pedro Palácios, founder of the Penha Convent

In the 16th century, when Portuguese colonizers first arrived in the region now known as Vila Velha, the area was contested by three distinct indigenous groups: the Goitacá (from the south), the Aimoré (from the interior), and the Tupiniquim (from the north). The Portuguese grantee of the Captaincy of Espírito Santo, Vasco Fernandes Coutinho, landed at the present-day Prainha (then called Piratininga by the indigenous people) aboard the caravel Glória with 60 men on 23 May 1535. He founded the "Vila do Espírito Santo" (now Vila Velha), named so because it was the Sunday of Pentecost. The settlement became the captaincy’s capital.

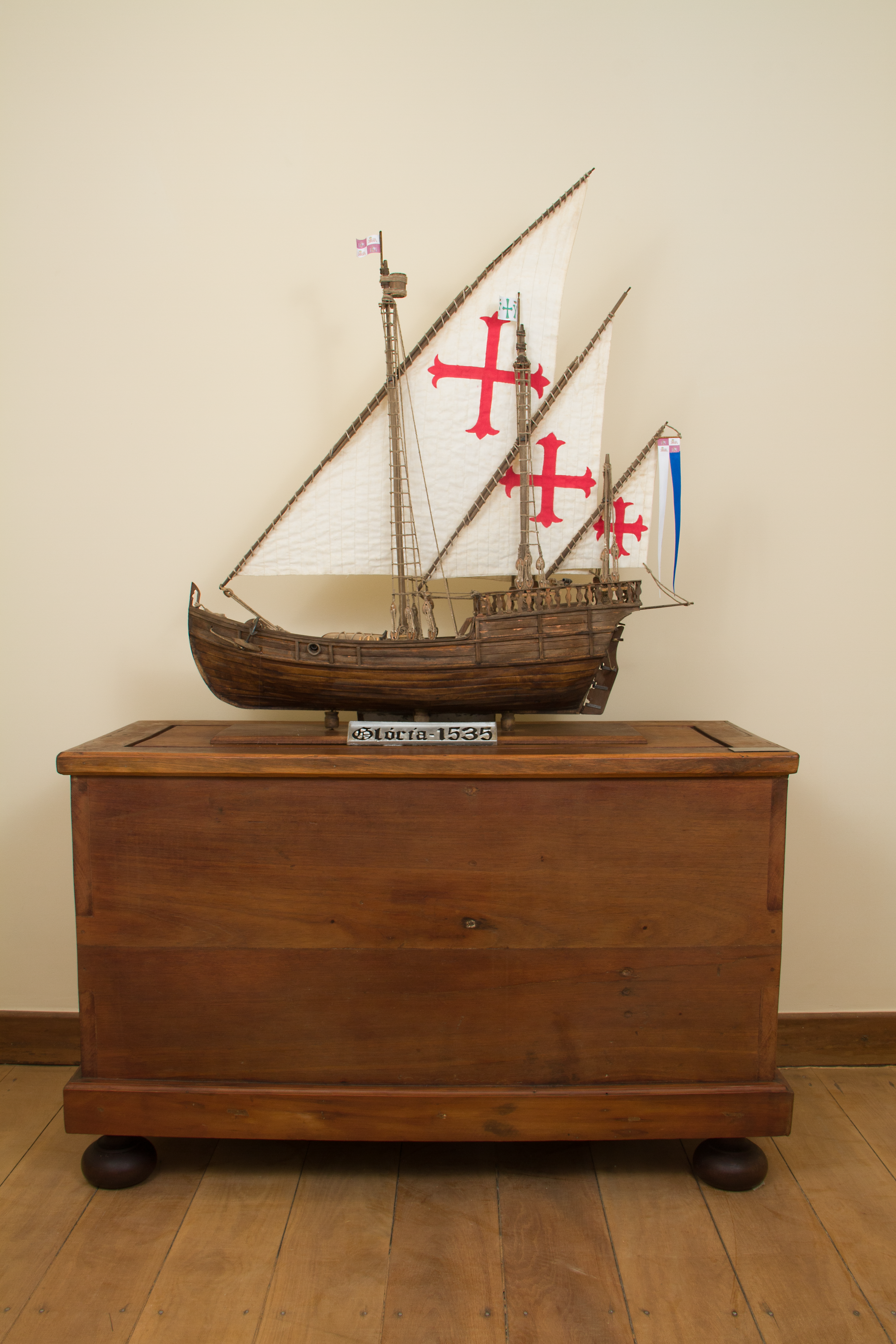
Wooden model of the Caravel Glória, displayed at the Memory House Museum

Due to frequent attacks by indigenous groups, French, and Dutch forces, the Portuguese relocated the captaincy’s capital in 1551 to the present-day city of Vitória, on Santo Antônio Island in Vitória Bay. In 1558, Friar Pedro Palácios, a native of Medina de Rioseco, Spain, arrived at Prainha. Years later, he was tasked with building a hermitage atop the Penha hill. Palácios commissioned an image of Our Lady from Lisbon, which gave rise to the devotion to Our Lady of Peñafrancia. The modest hermitage gradually evolved into the Penha Convent, now the most significant religious monument in Espírito Santo’s architecture.

Little is known about Vila Velha’s history from the 16th to the 19th centuries. During this period, notable events include the completion of the Penha Convent and Dutch attacks on sugar plantations in the 17th century. The city saw minimal development, with a provincial government report recording 2,120 inhabitants in 1827. Access to the capital, Vitória, which, unlike Vila Velha, was steadily growing, was challenging.

At that time, the economy relied on agriculture, sustained by slave labor of indigenous and Black individuals. In the area now known as the Aribiri neighborhood, a quilombo of escaped slaves existed, which, in the early 20th century, gave rise to a settlement and later the neighborhood.

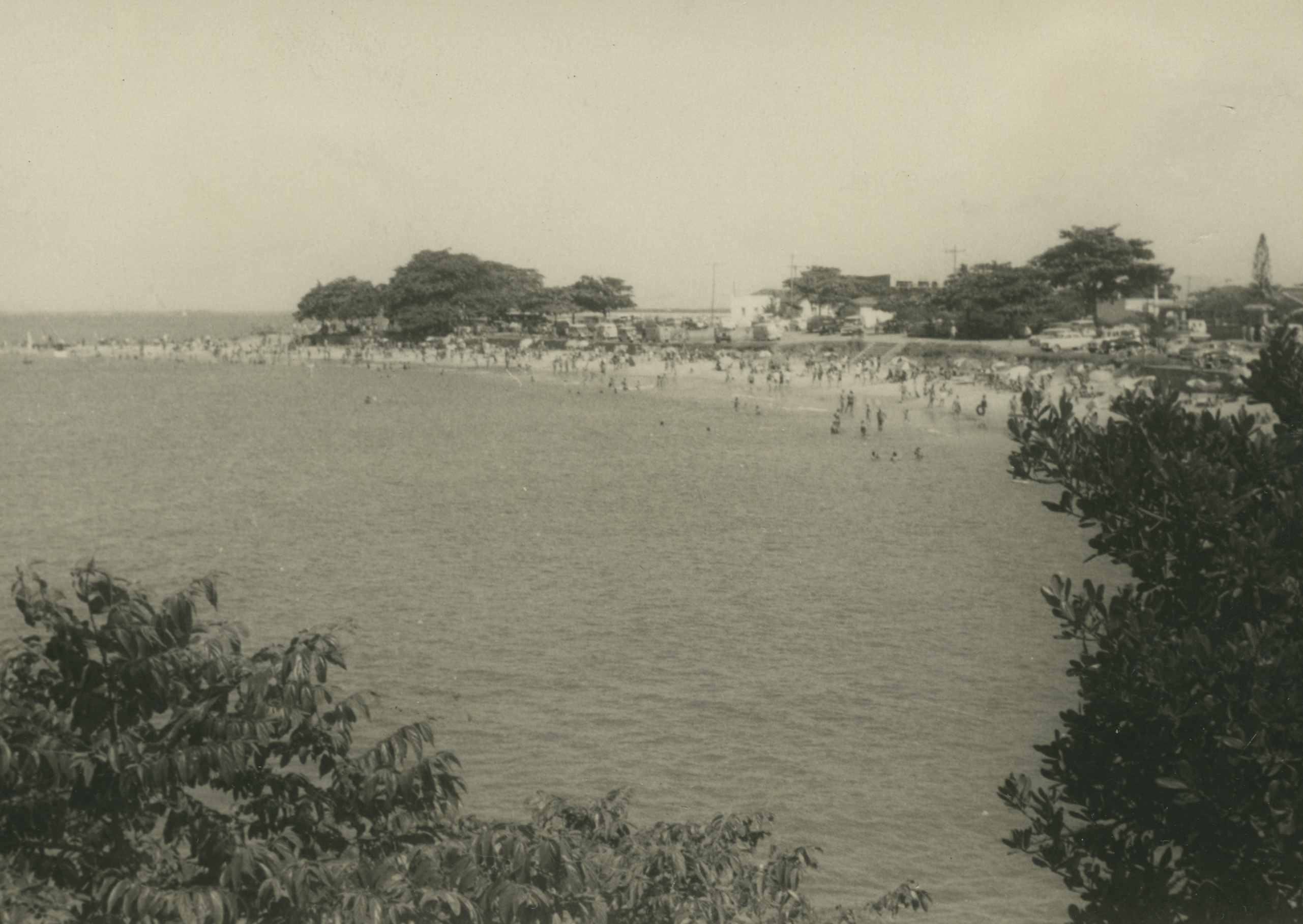
Vila Velha in 1964. National Archives.

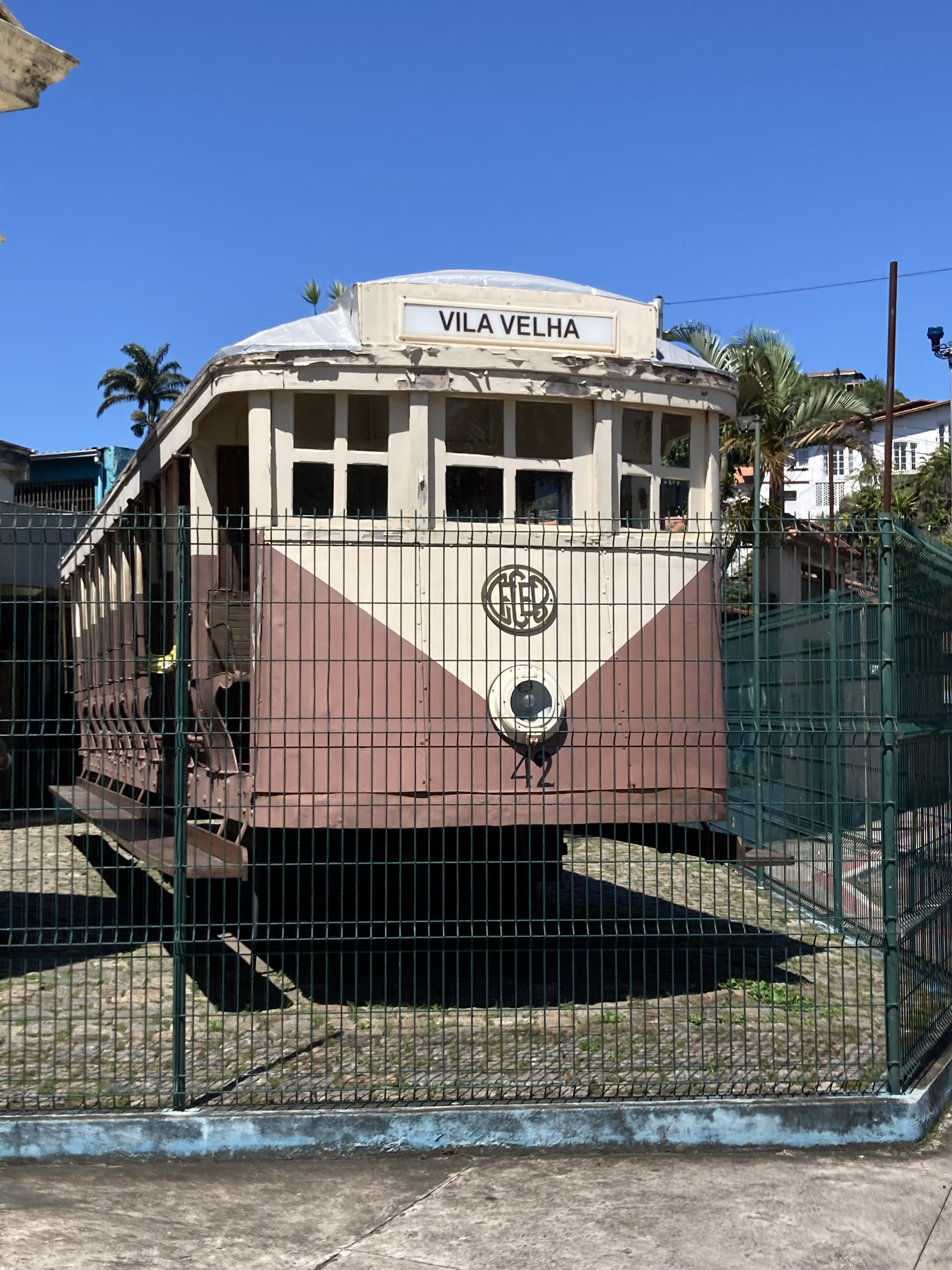
Tram 42, once used for public transport in the city, is now exhibited at the Memory House Museum in Vila Velha - 2025

In 1890, the municipality was formally established under the Espírito Santo Constitution, changing its name from "Vila do Espírito Santo" to "Vila Velha." In the following decade, a city plan was drafted, followed by street expansions and other infrastructure projects, which began attracting commercial investors. However, significant economic growth occurred only after the construction of the Florentino Ávidos Bridge in the late 1920s, connecting Vila Velha to Vitória. The opening of the Chocolates Garoto factory during this period also spurred development, drawing more residents and boosting commerce. The city’s tram, introduced in 1912, was gradually replaced by vehicles starting in the 1950s. On 21 April 1931, Vila Velha was annexed to Vitória but was reestablished in 1938. It was annexed again in 1943 and reestablished four years later, officially recognized by State Law No. 479 on 31 January 1959.

By 1950, the population had grown to approximately 24,000 inhabitants, but until the 1960s, Vila Velha remained closely tied to Vitória. Many residents of Vila Velha or its districts worked or studied in Vitória. The establishment of schools, commercial enterprises, and economic strengthening reversed this dependency. Investments in tourism also began, with improvements to beach infrastructure and the regularization of the hotel network, alongside the development of port terminals.

Today, Vila Velha stands out for its tourism and historical significance. The Penha Convent is the municipality’s primary attraction and one of the most important historical and religious landmarks in both Espírito Santo and Brazil. The presence of numerous beaches, such as Praia da Costa and Itapoã, enhances the city’s prominence. The city also boasts a robust real estate market and is a growing hub for garment manufacturing and foreign trade, with its port terminals handling approximately 90% of Espírito Santo’s exported goods.

== Geography ==
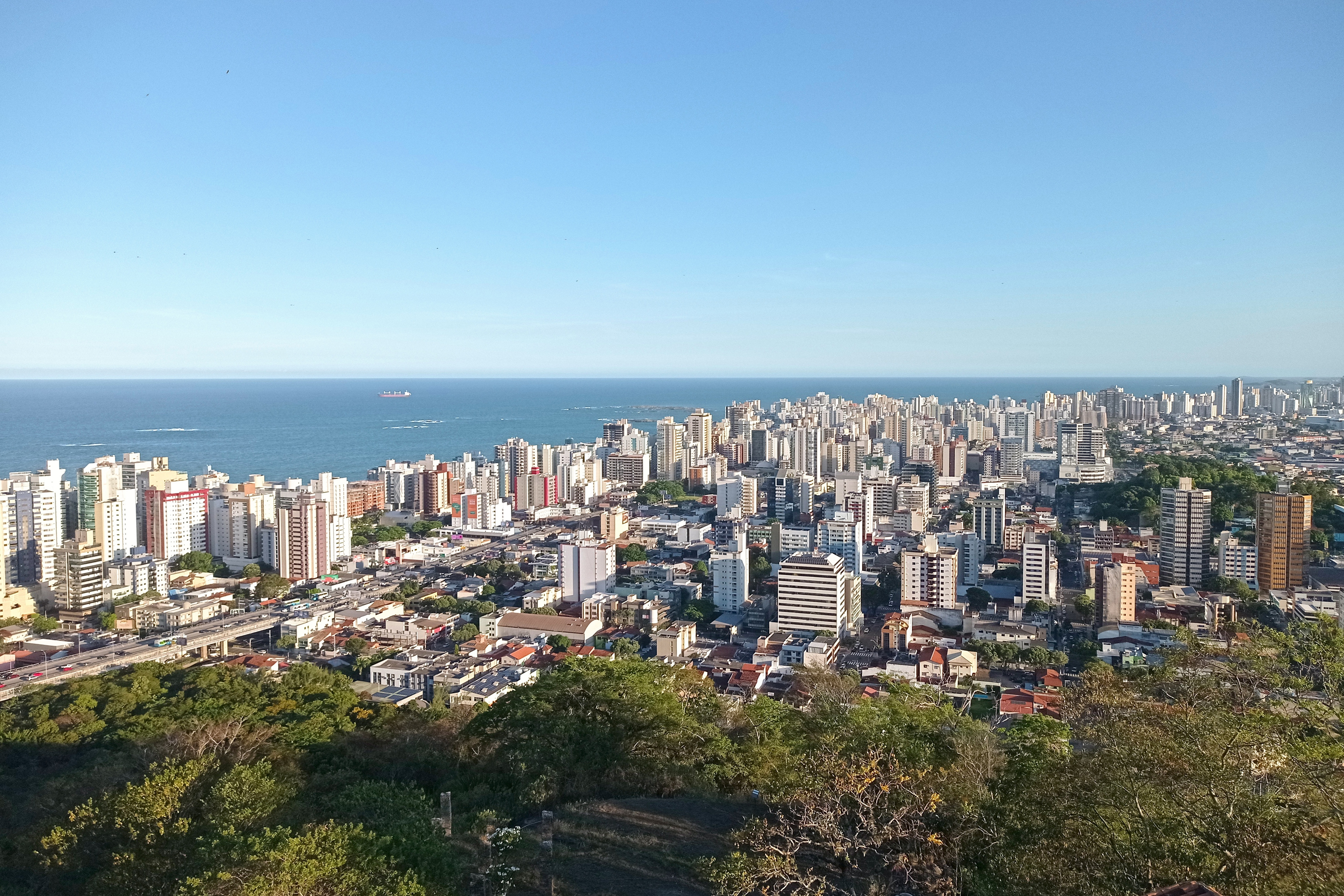
View of Vila Velha from the Penha Convent, with the sea in the background.

According to the Brazilian Institute of Geography and Statistics, the municipality spans 209.965 km^{2} (81.068 sq mi), with 54.57 km^{2} (21.07 sq mi) in the urban area and the remaining 155.49 km^{2} (60.04 sq mi) in the rural area. Located at 20°19'48" south latitude and 40°17'31" west longitude, it lies approximately 10 km (6.2 mi) south of the state capital, Vitória. Its neighboring municipalities are Vitória to the north, Cariacica and Viana to the west, Guarapari to the south, and the Atlantic Ocean to the east.

Under the regional division effective since 2017, established by the IBGE, the municipality belongs to the Intermediate and Immediate Geographic Regions of Vitória. Previously, under the division into microregions and mesoregions, it was part of the Vitória microregion, within the Central Espírito-Santense mesoregion.

The ongoing conurbation process in the region is forming a metropolis centered in Vitória, extending to the municipalities of Cariacica, Fundão, Guarapari, Serra, Viana, and Vila Velha. The Greater Vitória Metropolitan Area (RMV) was established by State Complementary Law No. 58 on 21 February 1995, and is currently the 14th largest urban agglomeration in Brazil, with over 1.68 million inhabitants. It is the most dynamic economic region in Espírito Santo, accounting for 58% of the state’s wealth and housing 46% of its population and 57% of its urban population.

Vila Velha encompasses two hydrographic basins: the Guarapari River and Jucu River basins, with areas of 32 km^{2} (12 sq mi) and 179 km^{2} (69 sq mi), respectively. The Jucu River is the main river flowing through the municipality, originating in the mountainous region of Domingos Martins and emptying into the Atlantic Ocean within Vila Velha’s territory. It supplies water to 60% of the Greater Vitória Metropolitan Area’s population. The river’s confluence with the sea occasionally forms small tidal bores during certain periods of the year.

The climate of Vila Velha is classified by the Brazilian Institute of Geography and Statistics as tropical hot super-humid (type Aw per the Köppen classification), characterized by dry, mild winters and rainy summers. Winds are consistent year-round, but the passage of occasional cold fronts can cause stronger gusts, with speeds exceeding 70 km/h (43 mph). Extreme cold events are rare. According to data from the automatic weather station of the National Institute of Meteorology (INMET) in Vila Velha, located at Fazenda Paraíso, the lowest temperature recorded was 9.1 °C (48.4 °F) on 19 May 2022, and the highest was 37.4 °C (99.3 °F) on 14 March 2019.

Climate data for Vila Velha (Fazenda Paraíso)
Month	Jan	Feb	Mar	Apr	May	Jun	Jul	Aug	Sep	Oct	Nov	Dec	Year
Record high °C (°F)	35.9 (96.6)	36.4 (97.5)	37.4 (99.3)	36.2 (97.2)	35.1 (95.2)	33.4 (92.1)	33.2 (91.8)	33.7 (92.7)	34.9 (94.8)	34.2 (93.6)	37 (99)	36.2 (97.2)	37.4 (99.3)
Record low °C (°F)	19.6 (67.3)	19.2 (66.6)	18.8 (65.8)	15.9 (60.6)	9.1 (48.4)	11.9 (53.4)	12.9 (55.2)	13.2 (55.8)	13.5 (56.3)	15.8 (60.4)	15.1 (59.2)	17.9 (64.2)	9.1 (48.4)
Source: INMET (14 February 2017–present)

=== Topography ===
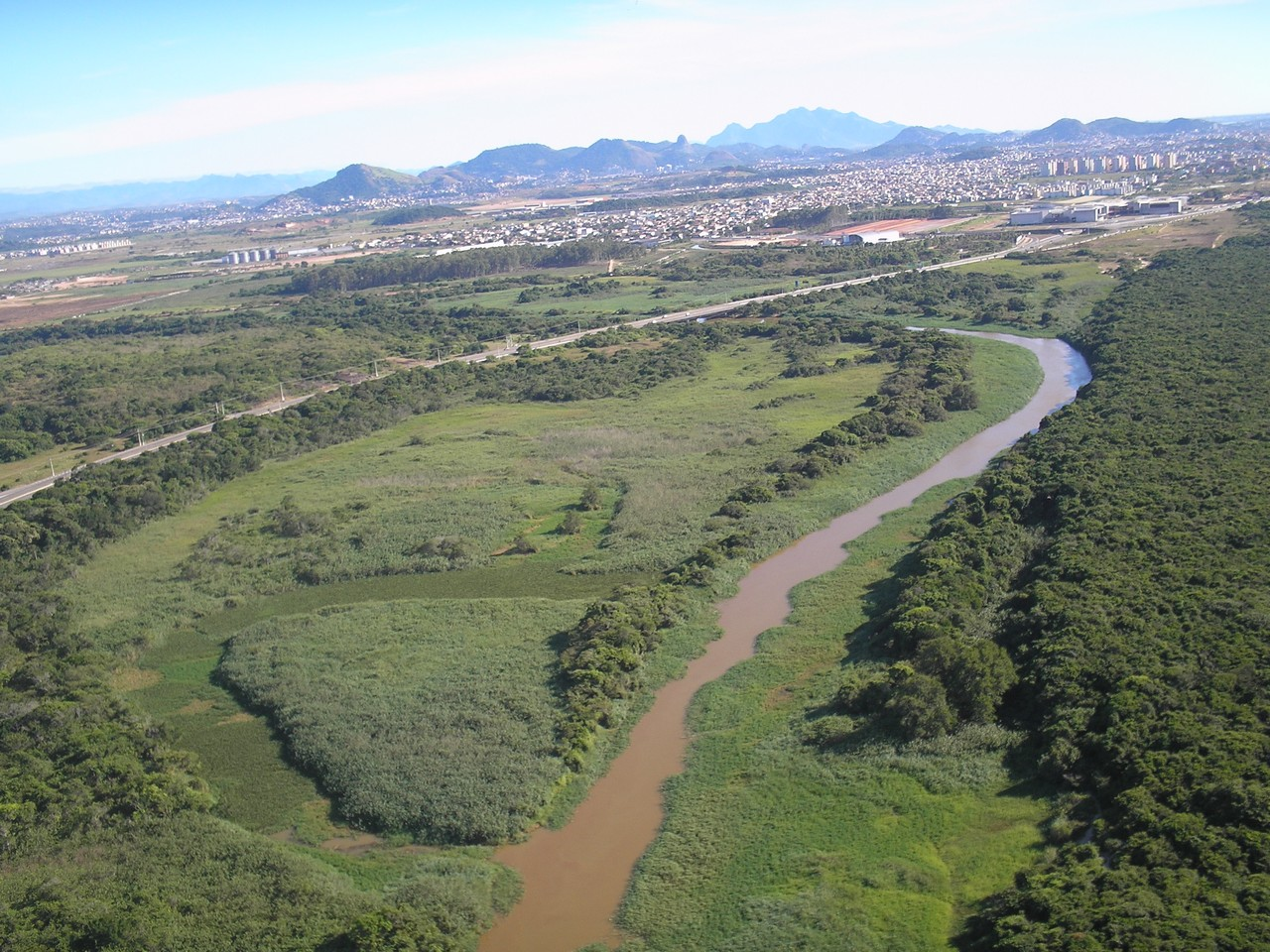
Jucu River, in the Jacarenema Municipal Natural Park, near Barra do Jucu.

The terrain is predominantly flat, with the average altitude of the municipal seat at 4 m (13 ft) above sea level. The municipality has 32 km (20 mi) of coastline along the Atlantic Ocean. Notable elevations include Morro da Concha, a rocky coastal formation covered with restinga; Morro do Penedo, composed of granitic formations and reaching 135 m (443 ft); Morro do Moreno, with an altitude of 164 m (538 ft), designated a natural heritage site by Municipal Law 262 of 1990 and Decree 202 of 1996, and hosting a significant remnant of Atlantic Forest; and Morro da Penha, at 154 m (505 ft), home to the Penha Convent, one of Espírito Santo’s most visited sites.

Several islands fall within Vila Velha’s territory. Itatiaia Island is a rocky island near the Praia de Itapuã coast, serving as a breeding ground for seabirds such as herons and swallows. Garças Island is another key breeding site for species such as herons and the black-crowned night heron, with its restinga vegetation supporting conservation efforts. Located 800 m (870 yd) from the mainland, it is used for fishing but access is restricted from January to March during the breeding season. Pacotes Island, restricted to the Brazilian Navy, hosts a maritime signaling lighthouse.

=== Ecology and environment ===
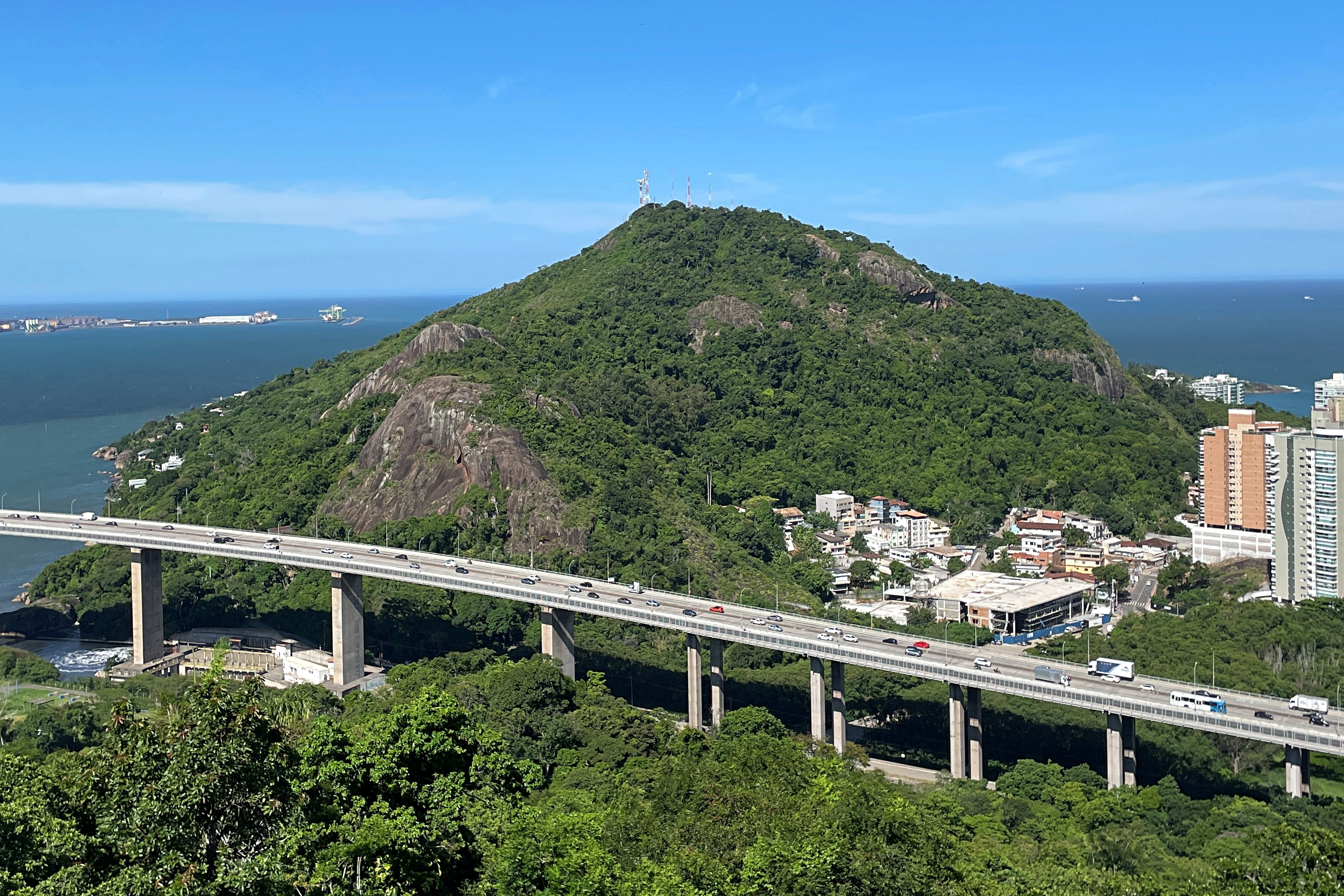
Third Bridge passing over a preservation area at the foot of Morro do Moreno

The original and predominant vegetation in the municipality is the Atlantic Forest, with some areas of restinga. However, much of the native forest has been cleared in recent years, primarily to accommodate urban expansion and the construction of condominiums, subdivisions, and residential developments. To address this, various initiatives have been implemented or are planned, including the creation of Natural Areas, which are non-urbanized zones designated as conservation units (UC) or Permanent Preservation Areas (APP).

Vila Velha has eleven Permanent Preservation Areas (APP): Lagoa Grande, in Ponta da Fruta; Morro de Argolas, established to protect the local Atlantic Forest fauna and flora; Morro do Pão Doce, in the São Torquato district; Lagoa de Jacuném, in Ponta da Fruta, encompassing a complex of about 100 ha (250 acres) of Atlantic Forest and restinga remnants; Morro da Ucharia, in the Prainha neighborhood; Morro do Convento, an ecological reserve also home to the Penha Convent; Morro do Moreno, a significant Atlantic Forest fragment covering 580,647.98 m^{2} (6,250,042.8 sq ft); Morro do Cruzeiro, a native forest reserve between the Jardim Colorado, Santos Dumont, Jardim Guadalajara, Brisamar, and Guadalupe neighborhoods; Morro do Jaburuna, a complex of three coastal rocky massifs hosting a native forest reserve; Lagoa Encantada, with an area of 1,194,804.85 m^{2} (12,860,772.4 sq ft); and Lagoa de Jabaeté, spanning 3,402,037.69 m^{2} (36,619,228.9 sq ft).

According to the municipality, there are currently three conservation units: the Morro da Manteigueira Municipal Natural Park, established on 13 November 1999, with an area of 168.30 ha (415.9 acres), located along the Vitória Bay channel at the mouth of the Aribiri River, near the Glória neighborhood; the Jacarenema Municipal Natural Park, created in 2003 and ratified in 2008, covering 346.27 ha (855.7 acres) in the Barra do Jucu neighborhood; and the Morro do Penedo Natural Monument, along the Vitória Bay channel, established in 2007 and regularized in 2010 to protect the Atlantic Forest remnants on the Morro do Penedo rocky formation.

== Demography ==
Historical population
Year	Pop.	±%
1970	123,742	—
1980	203,401	+64.4%
1991	265,586	+30.6%
2000	345,965	+30.3%
2010	414,586	+19.8%
2022	467,722	+12.8%
Source: Brazilian Institute of Geography and Statistics (IBGE)

In 2010, the Brazilian Institute of Geography and Statistics (IBGE) recorded the municipality’s population at 414,420 inhabitants, with 199,083 men and 215,337 women. According to the same census, 412,402 residents lived in the urban area, and 2,018 in the rural area. By 2020, statistics indicated a population of 501,325, making it the second most populous municipality in the state (behind Serra) and the 48th most populous in Brazil.

The Human Development Index of Vila Velha is considered very high by the United Nations Development Programme (UNDP), with a value of 0.8, ranking it the second highest in Espírito Santo (among 77 municipalities) and the 273rd in Brazil (among 5,570). Most of the city’s indicators are high and above the national average, according to the UNDP.

=== Poverty and inequality ===
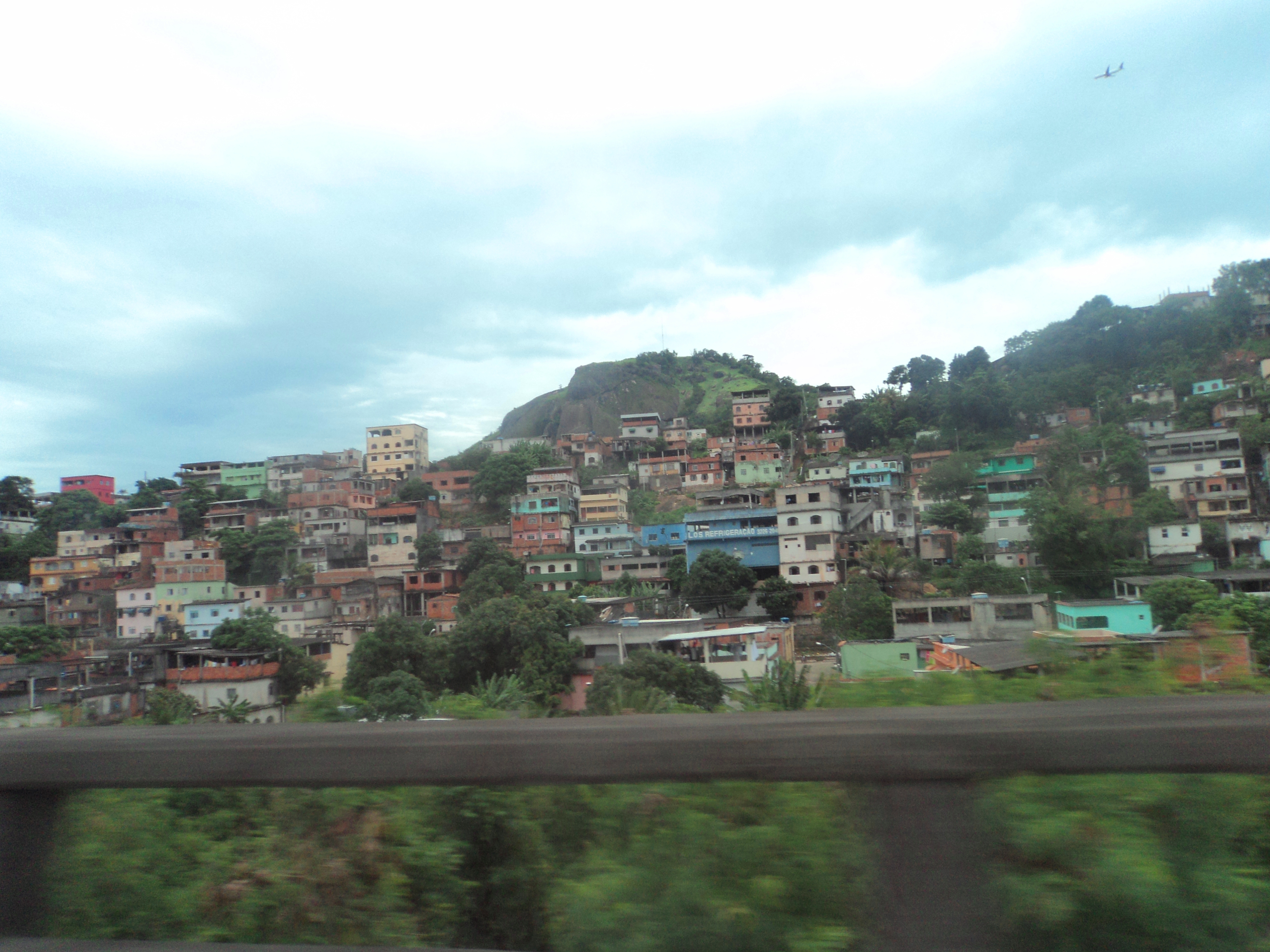
Slums in Vila Velha, in the São Torquato district, in 2011

According to the IBGE, in 2003, the Gini coefficient, which measures social inequality, was 0.40, where 1.00 represents the highest inequality and 0.00 the lowest. That year, the incidence of poverty, as measured by the IBGE, was 21.07%, with a lower limit of 18.27%, an upper limit of 23.87%, and a subjective poverty incidence of 17.11%.

From 2000 to 2010, the proportion of individuals with a per capita household income of up to half the minimum wage decreased by 54.6%. In 2010, 94.7% of the population lived above the poverty line, 3.4% were at the poverty line, and 1.8% were below it. In 2000, the wealthiest 20% of the population accounted for 61.3% of the municipality’s total income, 24 times higher than the 2.5% share of the poorest 20%. In 1991, the poorest 20% held 2.6% of the income, indicating an increase in social inequality from the early 1990s to 2000.

In 2008, according to the municipality, there were records of slums, stilt houses, and irregular subdivisions. In 2010, 61,485 inhabitants lived in subnormal agglomerations, areas characterized by irregular land occupation or urban zones with inadequate public services. The IBGE identifies Vila Velha as the municipality with the highest number of subnormal agglomerations in Espírito Santo, with the Barramares neighborhood being the largest, housing 12,405 inhabitants in 2010, according to the institute.

=== Religion ===
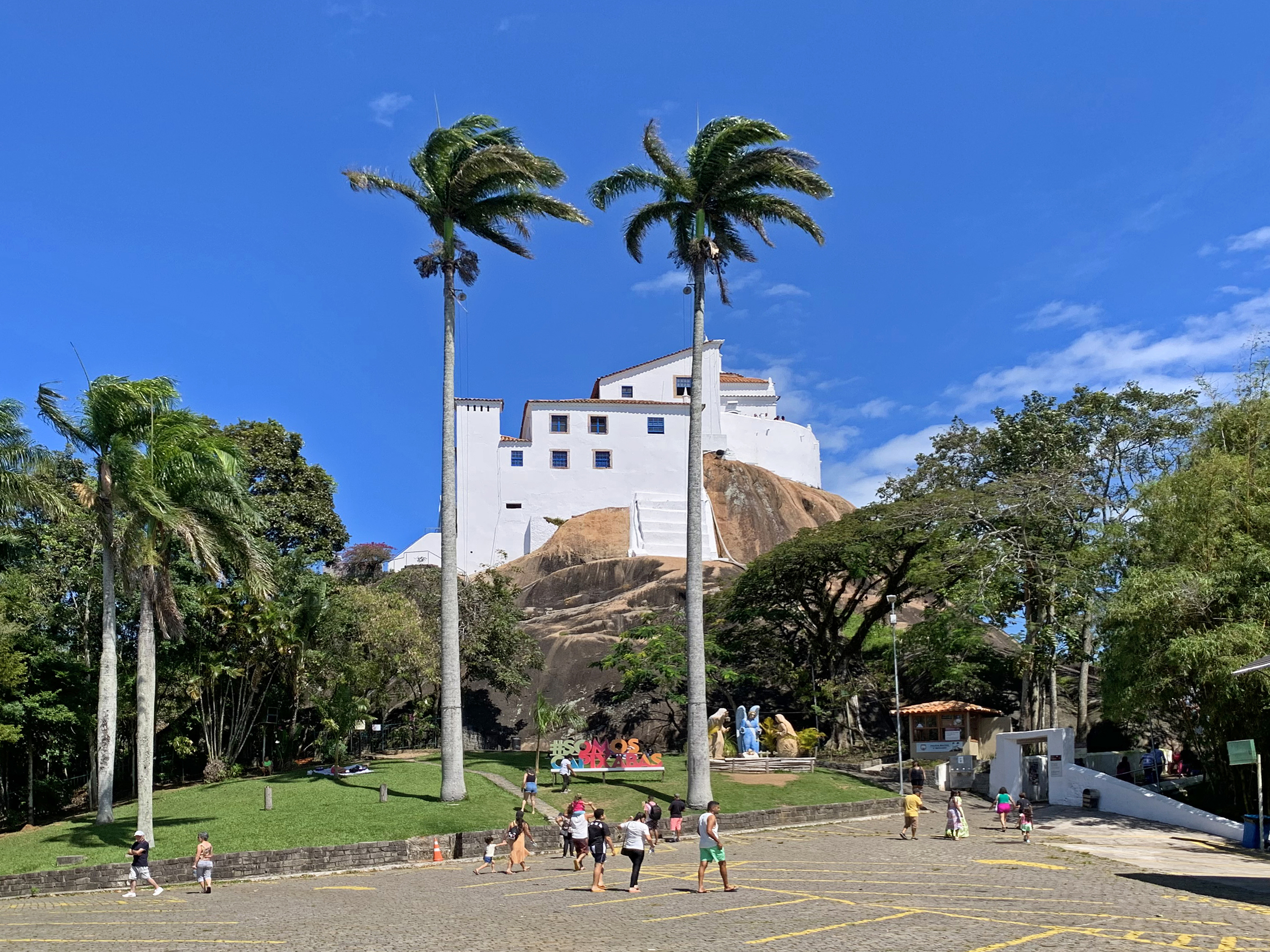
View of the Penha Convent from its parking lot

Most Vila Velha residents identify as Catholic, though the city now hosts dozens of different Protestant denominations, as well as practices such as Buddhism, Islam, Spiritism, and others. There are also notable Jewish, Mormon, and Afro-Brazilian religious communities. According to the 2010 census by the Brazilian Institute of Geography and Statistics, the population of Vila Velha comprises: Catholics (48.47%), Evangelicals (35.90%), people with no religion (11.10%), Spiritists (1.75%), with the remainder distributed among other religions.

=== Roman Catholic Church ===
According to the organizational structure of the Catholic Church, the municipality of Vila Velha is part of the Ecclesiastical Province of Vitória, with its seat in Vitória. It also belongs to the Archdiocese of Vitória, which was established as a diocese on November 15, 1895, and elevated to an archdiocese on February 16, 1958. Within the city, Catholic communities are organized under 15 parishes, namely: Convento Nossa Senhora da Penha (at the Penha Convent); Paróquia Nossa Senhora da Conceição Aparecida (Cobilândia); Paróquia Nossa Senhora da Glória (Glória); Paróquia Nossa Senhora das Graças (Coqueiral de Itaparica); Paróquia Nossa Senhora do Perpétuo Socorro (Praia da Costa); Paróquia Nossa Senhora do Rosário, Franciscans; Paróquia Nossa Senhora dos Navegantes, Orionites (Barra do Jucu); Paróquia Santa Mãe de Deus (Ibes); Paróquia Santa Rita de Cássia (Santa Rita); Paróquia Santa Terezinha do Menino Jesus, Missionaries of the Heart of Jesus (Paul); Paróquia Santíssima Trindade (Aribiri); Paróquia Santo Antônio de Santana Galvão (Guaranhuns); Paróquia São Francisco de Assis (Praia de Itapoã); and Paróquia São Lucas (Novo México).

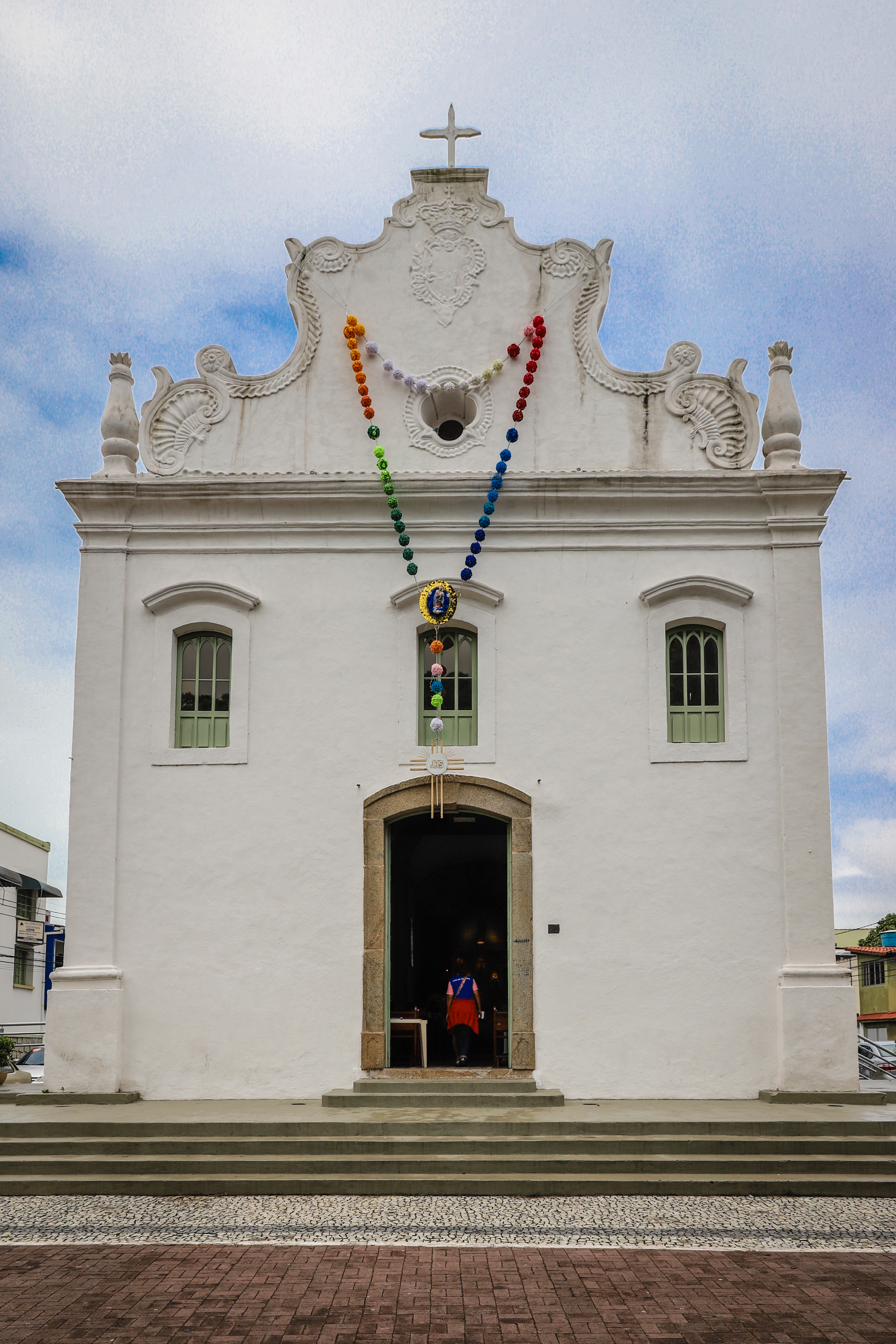
Façade of the Church of Our Lady of the Rosary

Since the founding of the "Vila do Espírito Santo" in 1535, Christianity has been a significant presence in Vila Velha, as evidenced by the city’s original name. Shortly thereafter, construction began on the most prominent Catholic religious site in both the municipality and the state, the Penha Convent. This site hosts the annual Festa da Penha every April, a Catholic cultural and religious celebration honoring the patroness of Espírito Santo, Our Lady of Peñafrancia. Other significant Catholic churches in the city, noted for their historical and architectural value, include the Church of Our Lady of the Rosary, one of the oldest in Brazil, which retains the original style of its façade reconstructed in the 18th century; and the Church of Our Lady of Glory, located in Barra do Jucu, built between 1900 and 1913 using stone masonry in the Gothic style.

=== Protestant, Pentecostal, and other churches ===
Vila Velha is home to a diverse array of Protestant and evangelical denominations, including historical and missionary groups such as the Presbyterian Church of Brazil, United Presbyterian Church of Brazil (which adheres to liberal theology), Evangelical Lutheran Church of Brazil (linked to German missions), Evangelical Lutheran Church (of American missionary origin), Reformed Anglican Church of Brazil, Union of Congregational Churches of Brazil, Brazilian Baptist Convention, and the Methodist Church in Brazil. Among Pentecostal churches, notable ones include the General Convention of the Assemblies of God in Brazil, National Convention of the Assemblies of God in Brazil (known as Assembleia de Deus Madureira), National Baptist Convention, God Is Love Pentecostal Church, and the International Church of the Foursquare Gospel. Within the Neo-charismatic movement, prominent churches include the Universal Church of the Kingdom of God, International Grace of God Church, World Church of God’s Power, and the Sara Nossa Terra Evangelical Community. Among Protestant denominations, the largest is the Christian Maranata Church, founded in Vila Velha over 50 years ago and present in all municipalities of Espírito Santo, followed by the Seventh-day Adventist Church and the Christian Congregation in Brazil. As noted earlier, according to the Brazilian Institute of Geography and Statistics, 35.90% of the population in 2010 identified as Protestant. Of this total, 20.58% belonged to Pentecostal evangelical churches, and 9.65% were part of missionary evangelical churches.

In smaller numbers, there are also Christians from various other denominations, including Jehovah’s Witnesses (representing 0.81% of the population), members of The Church of Jesus Christ of Latter-day Saints (0.17%), and adherents of spiritualist teachings (0.04% of the population).

==== Christian Maranata Church ====
Founded in Vila Velha in 1968, the Christian Maranata Church has expanded throughout Espírito Santo and Brazil, becoming the largest evangelical church in the state. It also has a presence in several countries worldwide. The Christian Maranata Church (ICM) is distinguished by its robust evangelistic efforts, providing spiritual and social support to communities.

The ICM operates under a hierarchical governance structure, with a presbytery in Vila Velha that centrally administers all its churches in Brazil and abroad. One of its well-known centers is the Maanaim, with the primary facility located in Domingos Martins, accommodating 4,000 people every two weeks for biblical seminars.

=== Ethnic groups and immigration ===
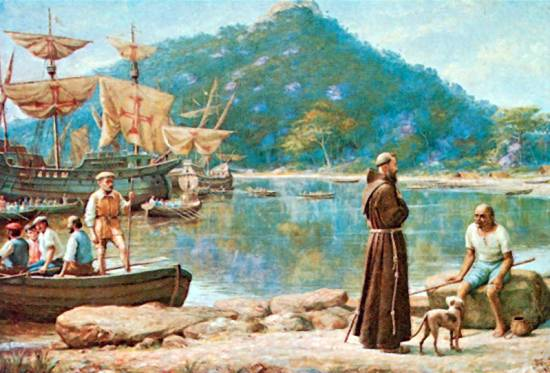
"The Arrival of Friar Pedro Palácios" (1926), a painting by Benedito Calixto depicting the arrival of Friar Pedro Palácios in 1558, a Spaniard tasked with constructing the Penha Convent

In 2010, according to data from the IBGE Census, the population of Vila Velha was composed of 195,475 multiracial individuals (47.15%), 181,278 Whites (43.73%), 33,859 Blacks (8.17%), 3,061 Asians (0.74%), and 896 Indigenous individuals (0.22%), with 17 undeclared.

The first immigrants arrived in the area now known as Vila Velha during the colonial period, coexisting with the indigenous population. With the establishment of the new capital of the Captaincy of Espírito Santo, Vasco Fernandes Coutinho brought 60 men, most of whom were Portuguese. In subsequent years, small numbers of Spaniards and Dutch also arrived. In the late 19th century and particularly during the 20th century, employment opportunities attracted more immigrants, with the most significant influx occurring in the 1960s. It is estimated that 75% of immigrants during this period were Italians, who settled on private properties, as the region lacked agricultural colonies like those in the interior of Espírito Santo.

Conversely, in 2010, 2,982 individuals emigrated from Vila Velha to other countries, with 876 moving to the United States (29.38%), 787 to Portugal (26.39%), 427 to Italy (14.32%), 224 to England (7.51%), 175 to Spain (5.87%), and 493 to other destinations worldwide (16.53%). The majority of these emigrants left Brazil in search of better living conditions and greater job opportunities.

== Politics and administration ==
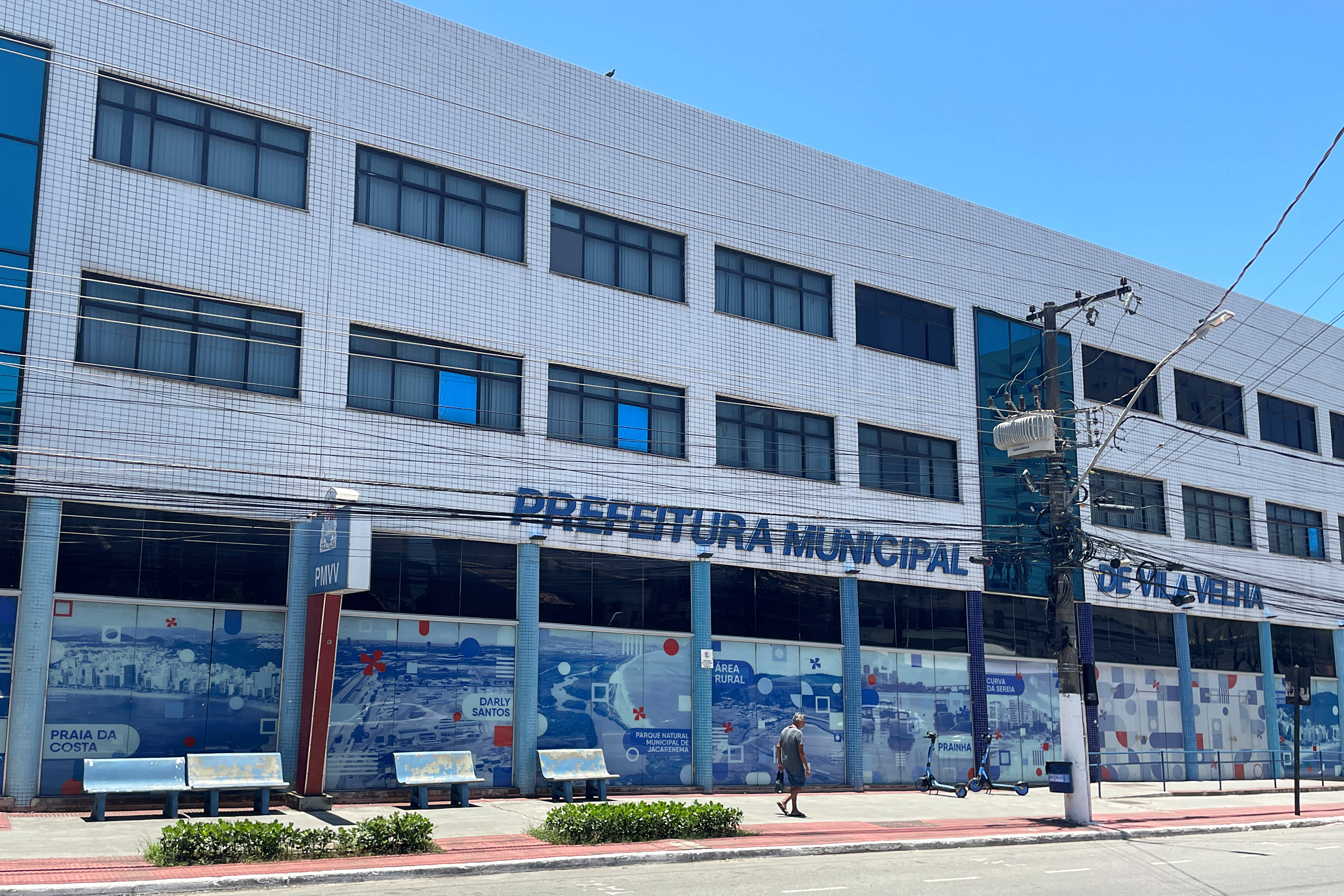
Vila Velha town hall

Municipal administration in Vila Velha is carried out by the Executive and Legislative branches. The Executive branch is led by the mayor, supported by a cabinet of secretaries. The current mayor is Arnaldinho Borgo (Podemos), who was elected in the second round of the 2020 municipal elections. The Legislative branch is represented by the municipal chamber, which consists of 17 councilors. The chamber is responsible for drafting and voting on fundamental laws for the administration and the Executive, particularly the participatory budget (Budget Guidelines Law).

To complement the legislative process and the work of the secretariats, several active municipal councils are in operation, including those for the rights of children and adolescents (established in 1991), guardianship (1997), the elderly (2004), and women (2002). Vila Velha is governed by its organic law, promulgated on October 25, 1990, and hosts a judicial district of the state judiciary. As of September 2018, the municipality had 298,748 registered voters, according to the Superior Electoral Court (TSE), making it the second-largest electoral college in Espírito Santo, behind only Serra (320,800 voters). Due to having more than 200,000 voters, a second round is required in municipal elections if the leading mayoral candidate does not secure more than 50% of the votes in the first round. The city of Qingdao, in China, has been a sister city of Vila Velha since April 2011.

== Subdivisions ==
Vila Velha is divided into five districts: Argolas, Ibes, Jucu, São Torquato, and the Sede. The Sede is the most populous, with 171,862 inhabitants, followed by Ibes, with 124,630 residents, according to the IBGE in 2010. Argolas and Jucu were established by state decree-law no. 15177 on December 31, 1943, initially under the jurisdiction of Vitória, and were transferred to Vila Velha in 1947. São Torquato and Ibes were created by state law no. 1935 on January 8, 1964. The municipality is further divided into ninety-two official neighborhoods, as defined by law no. 4707 of 2008.

Districts of Vila Velha (IBGE/2010)
District	Population			Private households
District	Men	Women	Total	Private households
Argolas	17,692	18,888	36,580	12,486
Ibes	59,770	64,860	124,630	44,322
Jucu	31,114	31,595	62,709	23,503
São Torquato	9,086	9,719	18,805	7,018
Sede	81,414	90,378	171,862	69,575

== Economy ==
According to 2010 IBGE data, Vila Velha's GDP was R$6,978,690,000. Of this, R$1,168,138,000 consisted of taxes on products net of subsidies at current prices. The GDP per capita was R$16,839.60 reais.

According to the Brazilian Institute of Geography and Statistics (IBGE), in 2010, the city had 13,621 local units and 13,198 active commercial enterprises and establishments. A total of 111,610 workers were classified as employed, with 94,617 categorized as salaried employees. Salaries and other remuneration amounted to R$1,403,035,000, and the average monthly salary in the municipality was 2.3 minimum wages. Agriculture, which sustained Vila Velha for much of its history since its founding, declined in importance during the 20th century, giving way to commerce, tourism, and industry.

=== Primary sector ===
Production of sugarcane, cassava, and corn (2010)
Product	Harvested area (hectares)	Production (tons)
Sugarcane	100	5,400
Cassava	45	675
Corn	25	38

Agriculture is the least significant sector of Vila Velha's economy. Of the city's total gross domestic product, R$12,171,000 is the gross value added by agriculture. According to the Brazilian Institute of Geography and Statistics, in 2010, the municipality had approximately 17,490 cattle, 520 horses, ten donkeys, 130 mules, 5,623 pigs, 295 goats, and 400 sheep. There were 2,825 poultry, including 2,140 roosters, pullets, broilers, and chicks, 685 hens, and 16,700 quails, with 5,000 dozen chicken eggs and 431,000 dozen quail eggs produced. A total of 1,700 cows were milked, yielding 1,239,000 liters of milk. Additionally, 10,020 kilograms of honey were produced. Maritime fishing is also notable, with approximately 1,000 fishermen and 548 registered vessels, capturing an average of 250 tons of fish monthly.

In temporary crop farming, the main products are sugarcane (5,400 tons produced from 100 hectares), cassava (675 tons from 45 hectares), corn (38 tons from 25 hectares), and beans (32 tons from 40 hectares). In permanent crops, notable products include coconut (366,000 fruits from 70 hectares), coagulated latex rubber (239 tons from 199 hectares), oranges (93 tons from 13 hectares), coffee (50 tons from 25 hectares), and heart of palm (16 tons from 11 hectares).

=== Secondary sector ===
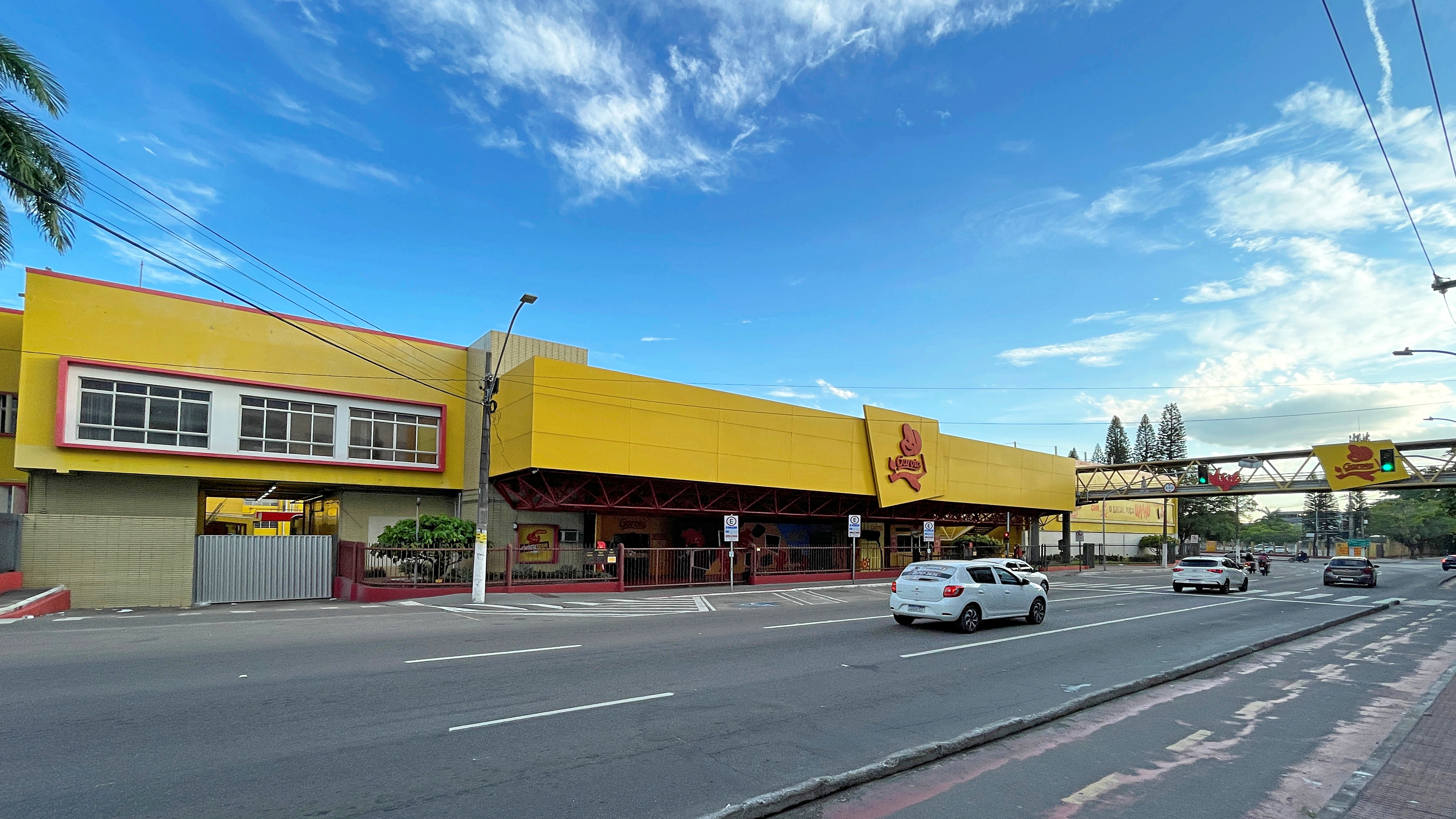
Chocolates Garoto factory

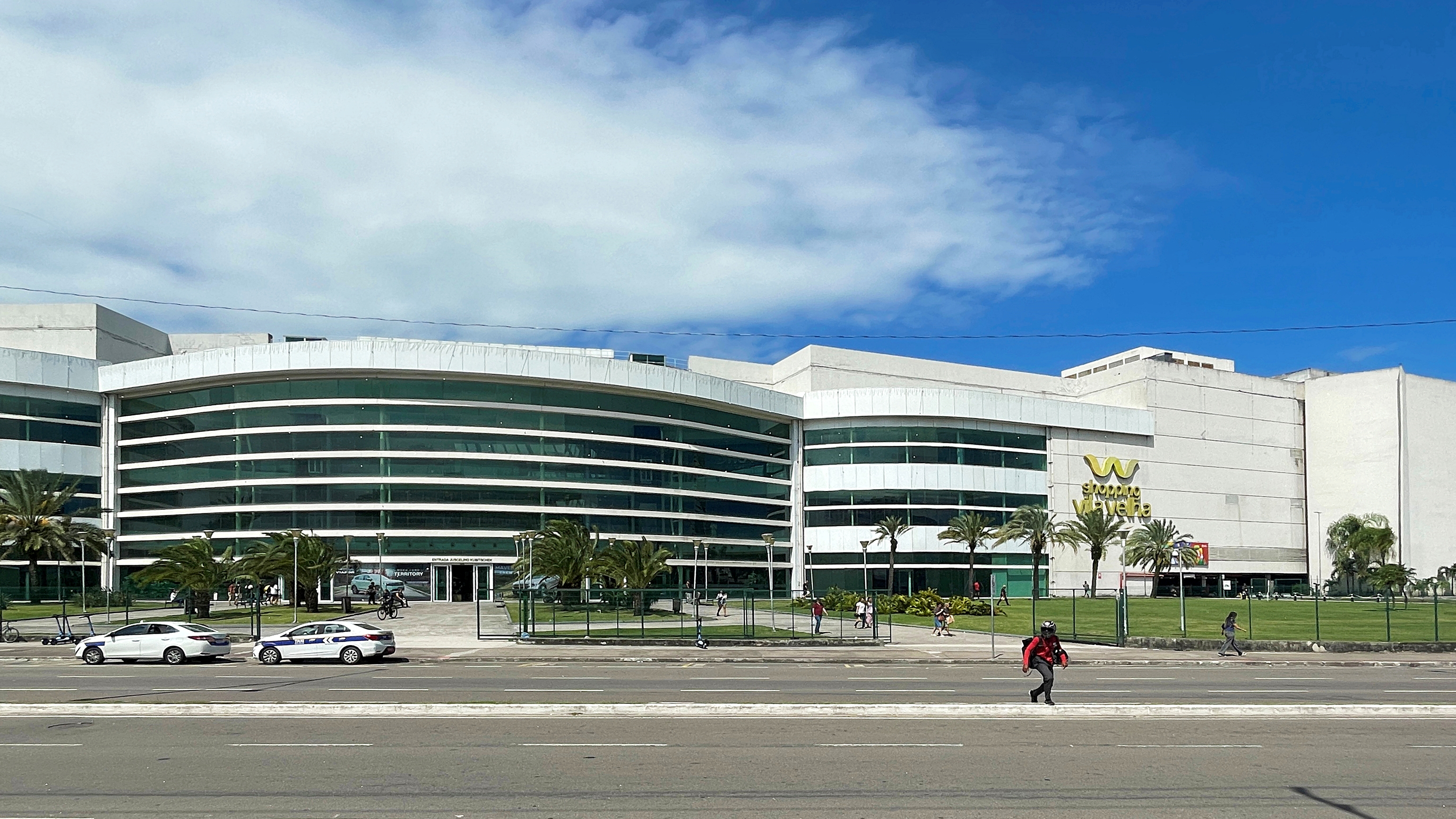
Shopping Vila Velha, one of the city's shopping centers

The industry is currently the second most significant sector of the municipal economy. R$1,513,311,000 of the municipal gross domestic product comes from the gross value added by industry (secondary sector). Industry gained prominence in the city with the establishment of the Chocolates Garoto factory, founded in August 1929, which is now one of the largest in the country. In addition to Garoto, the city excels in foreign trade and port systems, light industries (food, clothing, and beverages), and civil construction.

The Vila Velha Port Terminal is one of the largest in southeastern Brazil, and Espírito Santo is considered a privileged area for this activity due to its central location in Brazil and easy connections to the rest of the country. The port exports steel products, marble and granite, coffee, automobiles, solid bulk, paper rolls, and cellulose to various states and countries.

=== Tertiary sector ===
The provision of services contributes R$4,285,070,000 to the municipal gross domestic product, making it the largest source of Vila Velha's GDP, accounting for 72.44% of the city's average annual revenue. In the tertiary sector, commerce and tourism are the highlights. Most commercial establishments in Vila Velha are micro and small businesses, which accounted for 73% of formal job hires in August 2012. By October 2012, there were 11,850 registered individual entrepreneurs in the municipality. Projects implemented by the city hall, in partnership with the state or the Brazilian Service of Support for Micro and Small Enterprises (Sebrae), aim to encourage and guide the work of micro and small entrepreneurs.

Key commercial areas include the numerous open-air markets scattered throughout the city; the Glória Fashion Pole, located in the Glória neighborhood, with over 900 stores spread across several streets and dozens of galleries offering jewelry, bags, belts, beachwear, jeans, knits, and fabrics; as well as the city center and along the waterfront. The avenues along the coast also host most of the inns, hotels, and restaurants catering to various economic classes.

== Urban structure ==
=== Education ===
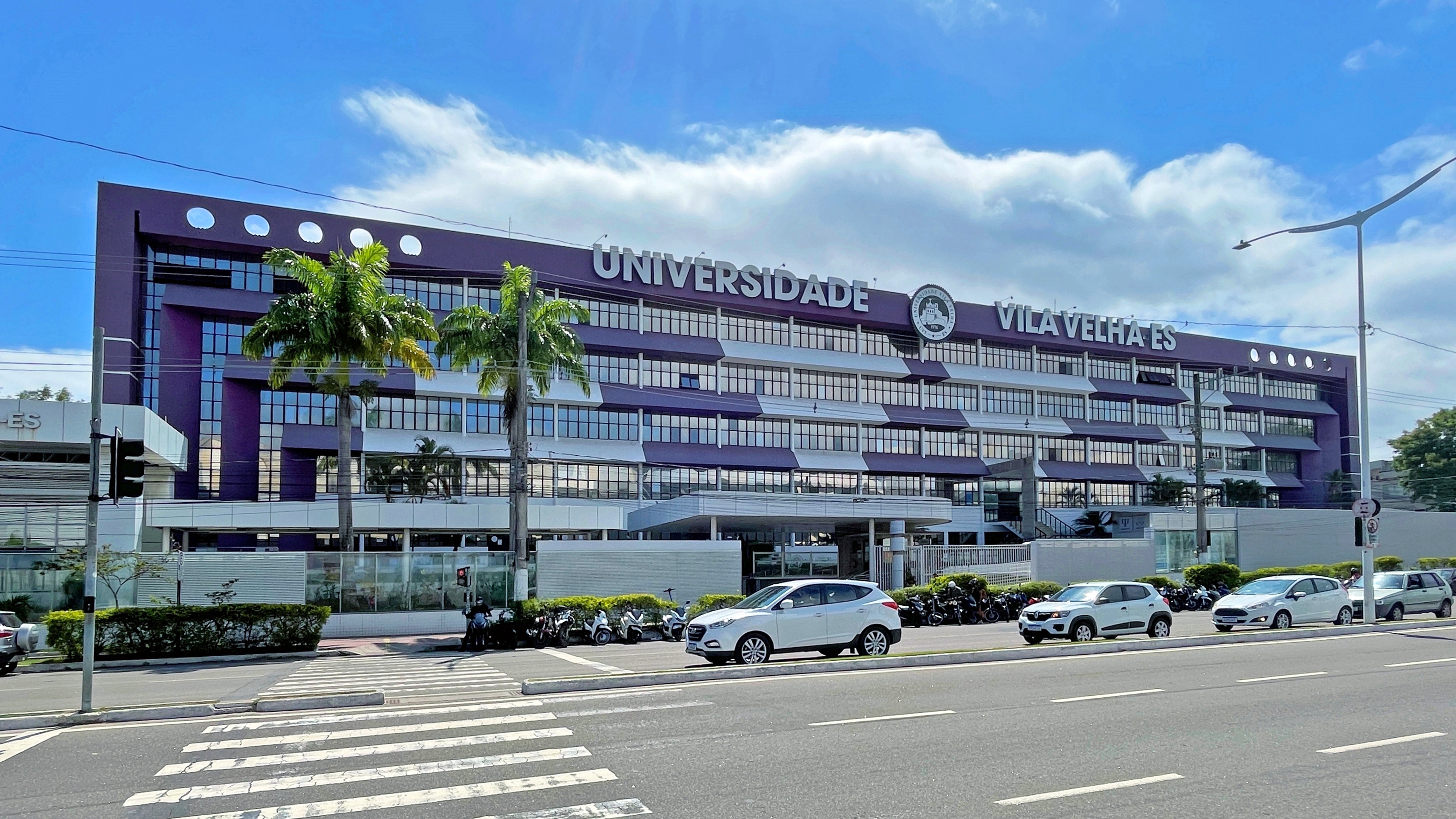
Campus of the Vila Velha University (UVV), a private university in the city.

In 2011, the average Basic Education Development Index among Vila Velha's public schools was 4.3, matching the average for municipal and state schools across Brazil. The Human Development Index (HDI) for education was 0.734 (classified as high), compared to Brazil's 0.849. In 1991, the index was 0.686.

In 2009, the municipality had approximately 80,838 enrollments in public and private schools. According to the IBGE, in the same year, of the 135 elementary schools, 21 were state-run, 58 were municipal, and 56 were private. Of the 47 high schools, 18 were state-run, and 29 were private. In 2010, 13.4% of children aged 7 to 14 were not attending elementary school, and the completion rate among youths aged 15 to 17 was 63.1%. The literacy rate for the population aged 15 to 24 was 99.1%. In 2006, for every 100 girls in elementary school, there were 104 boys.

The Municipal Education Secretariat aims to coordinate and provide administrative and pedagogical support to Vila Velha's school system. Examples of programs coordinated by the Secretariat include Youth and Adult Education (EJA), a free education network for adults who did not complete elementary school, and a special education network, where students with physical disabilities are supported by specialized teachers in adapted classrooms.

Education in Vila Velha by numbers
Level	Enrollments	Teachers	Schools (total)
Early childhood education	9,237	513	90
Primary education	56,473	2,632	135
Secondary education	15,128	915	47

=== Health ===
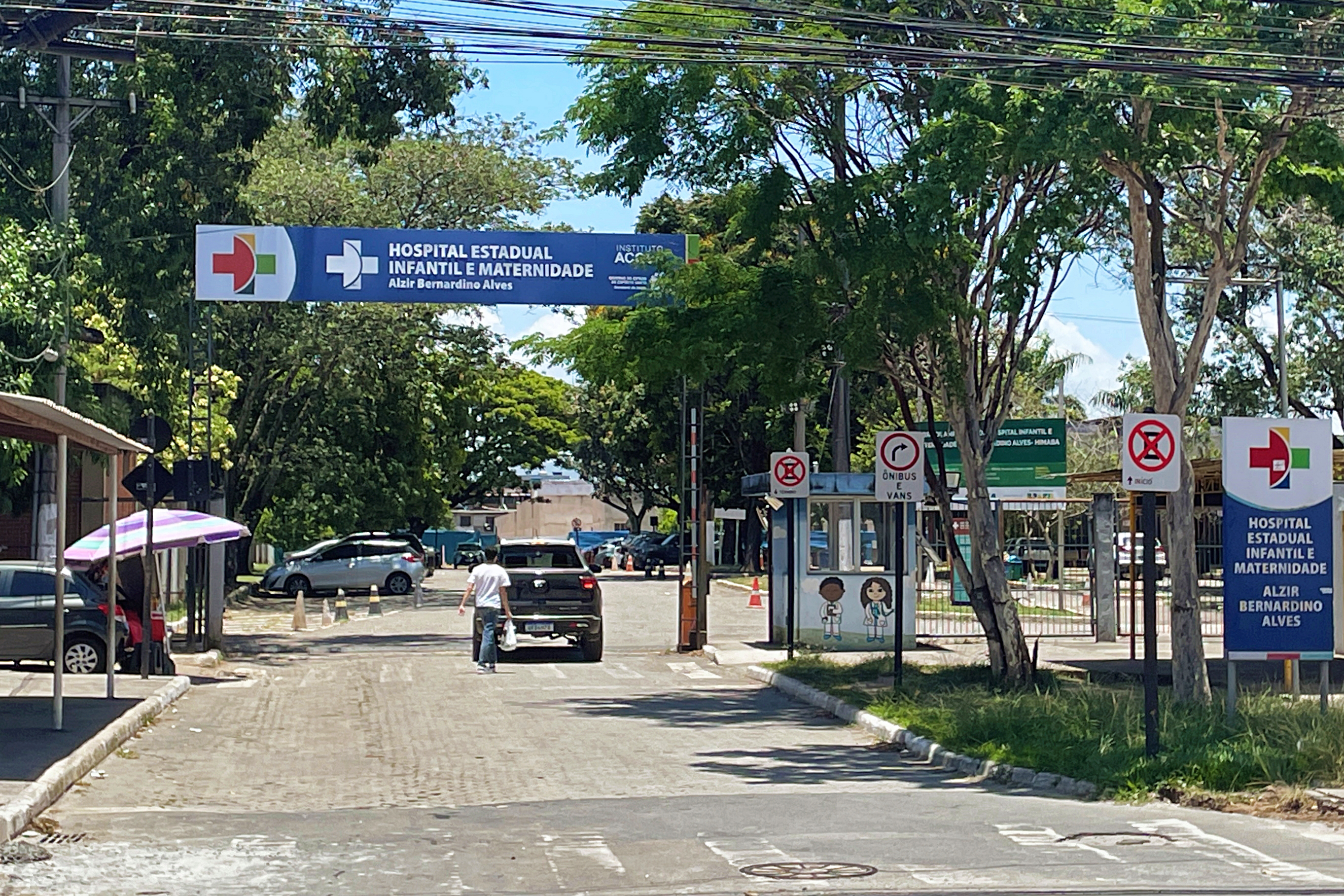
Entrance of the Alzir Bernardino Alves Children's State Hospital and Maternity

In 2009, Vila Velha had 163 healthcare facilities, including hospitals, emergency rooms, health clinics, and dental services, with 28 being public and 135 private. These facilities provided 792 hospitalization beds, with 207 in public facilities and 585 in private ones. In 2011, 92.2% of children under one year old had up-to-date vaccination records. In 2010, the infant mortality rate was 8.4 per 1,000 children under one year old, with 99.7% of live births attended by qualified health professionals, and the birth rate was 5,820 live births. In the same year, 14.8% of pregnant women were girls under 20 years old. A total of 22,518 children were weighed by the Family Health Program, with 0.4% found to be malnourished.

As of January 2013, Vila Velha's municipal healthcare network consisted of 17 Primary Healthcare Units, seven of which operate under the Family Health Strategy, where specialized medical teams map territories for home visits, and ten function as traditional units with scheduled consultations or minor emergencies. The Municipal Health Secretariat, a body under the city hall responsible for managing public health services, also maintains programs such as the School Health Program, which organizes lectures, workshops, and oral health prevention for schoolchildren; the Adolescent Health Program; the Elderly Health Program; and the Worker Health Program.

=== Public safety and crime ===
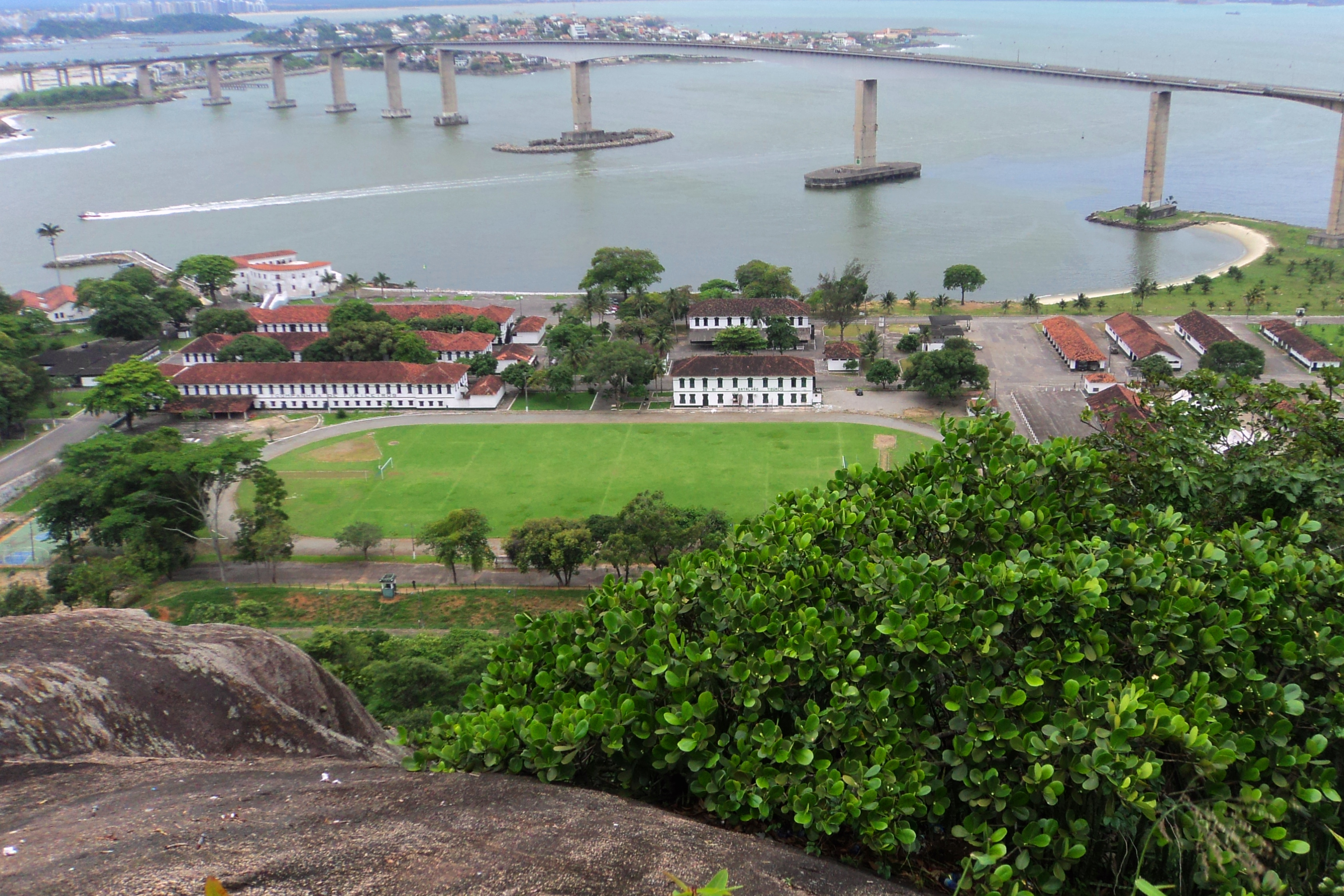
View of the 38th Infantry Battalion, a Brazilian Army unit in Vila Velha

As in most medium and large Brazilian municipalities, crime remains a challenge in Vila Velha. In 2011, the homicide rate was 60.4 per 100,000 inhabitants, ranking ninth in the state and 79th nationally. The suicide rate was 3.9 per 100,000 inhabitants, placing it 38th in the state and 1,503rd nationally. The death rate from traffic accidents was 8.6 per 100,000 inhabitants, ranking 63rd in the state and 2,191st nationally.

The Vila Velha Municipal Security Council, established by municipal law 3,320 on July 23, 1997, and restructured on October 19, 2001, is tasked with proposing measures and activities to enhance municipal security. It comprises representatives (both primary and alternate) from various entities, including the Military Police, Civil Police, Municipal Civil Guard, Juvenile Court, Municipal Secretariat of Planning and Urban Development, the community, industry, and commerce.

Vila Velha's prison system has frequently faced issues such as riots and allegations of prisoner mistreatment, with overcrowding being a primary cause. There have also been reports of deaths and escapes. The municipality's Judicial Police Department has been reported to the United Nations and the Organization of American States for violations of human rights. The city also hosts the Espírito Santo Apprentice Sailors School (EAMES), one of four Brazilian Navy Apprentice Schools, which serves as a pathway for recruitment into the Brazilian Navy.

=== Housing, services, and communication ===
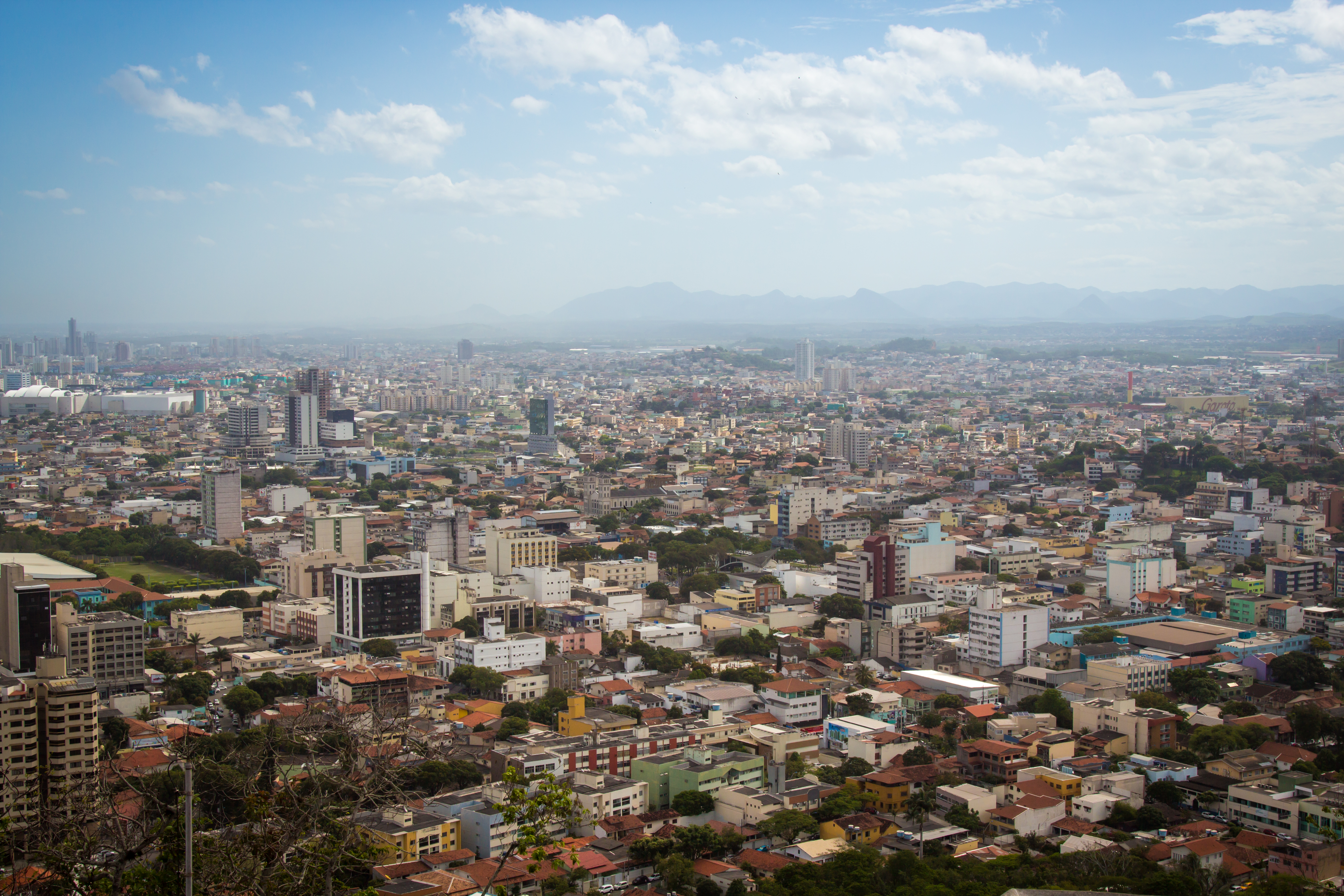
Vila Velha seen from the Penha Convent

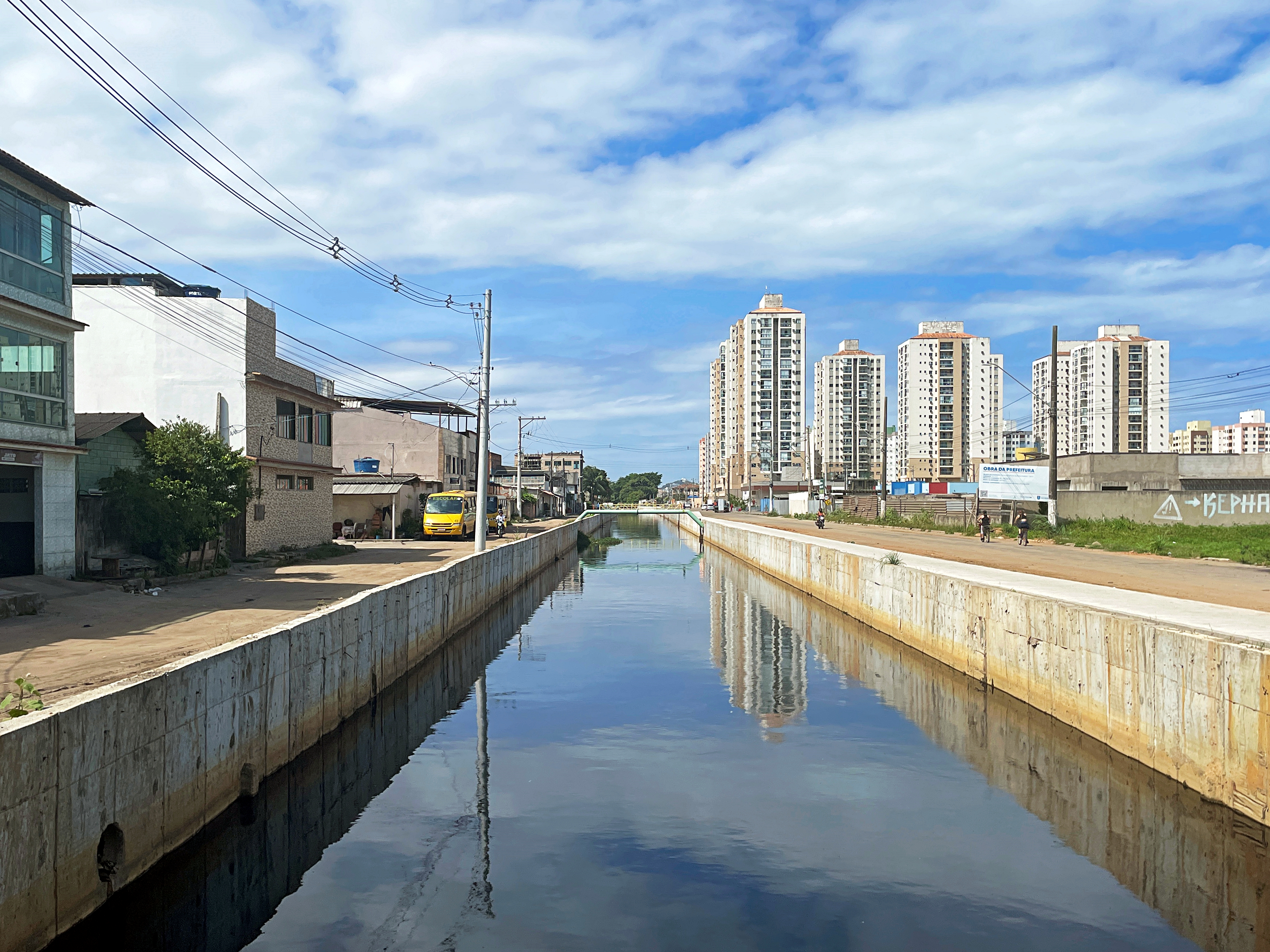
Drainage canal of the Garanhuns Stream

In 2010, according to the IBGE, Vila Velha had 134,467 permanent private households, including 90,499 houses, 1,321 apartments, 41,676 houses in villages or condominiums, and 971 rooms or shanties. Of the total private households, 94,571 were owned properties, with 87,661 fully paid, 6,910 under acquisition, and 31,632 rented; 7,938 properties were provided, with 792 by employers and 7,146 provided otherwise. Another 326 were occupied in other forms. Most of the municipality has access to treated water, electricity, sewage, urban cleaning, landline telephone services, and mobile phone services. In 2010, 98.63% of households were served by the general water supply network; 99.09% of residences had garbage collection (either through cleaning services or otherwise), and 98.94% of households had exclusive-use bathrooms.

The Companhia Espírito Santense de Saneamento is responsible for sewage collection and water supply in Vila Velha, as well as much of Espírito Santo. According to the company, the entire urban area of the city has access to treated water, with much of the water supply coming from the Jucu River, which serves 60% of the population of Greater Vitória. However, 52% of urban residents lack sewage collection and treatment networks in their homes. In May 2012, half of Vila Velha's sewage was treated, while the other half was discharged directly into channels within the city. According to the Companhia Espírito Santense de Saneamento, by January 2015, the entire city will have treated sewage with the inauguration of the Grande Terra Vermelha Sewage Treatment Plant.

The Espírito Santo Centrais Elétricas S.A. is responsible for electricity supply in Vila Velha, serving 78 other municipalities in Greater Vitória and the state's interior. In 2010, 99.91% of the municipality's households were served by this service. Dial-up and broadband (ADSL) internet services are offered by various free and paid Internet service providers. Mobile phone services are provided by multiple operators, and some areas have wireless networks. Vila Velha's area code (DDD) is 027, and its postal code (CEP) ranges from 29100-001 to 29129-999.

Several VHF and UHF television channels are available, with some major broadcasters affiliated in the city or the Vitória Metropolitan Region, such as TV Vitória (affiliated with RecordTV), TV Gazeta Vitória (TV Globo), and TV Tribuna (affiliated with Sistema Brasileiro de Televisão/SBT). Vila Velha also has several circulating newspapers, including "A Gazeta," "A Tribuna," "ES Hoje," "Século Diário," and "A Crônica."

=== Transportation ===
==== Air and water transportation ====
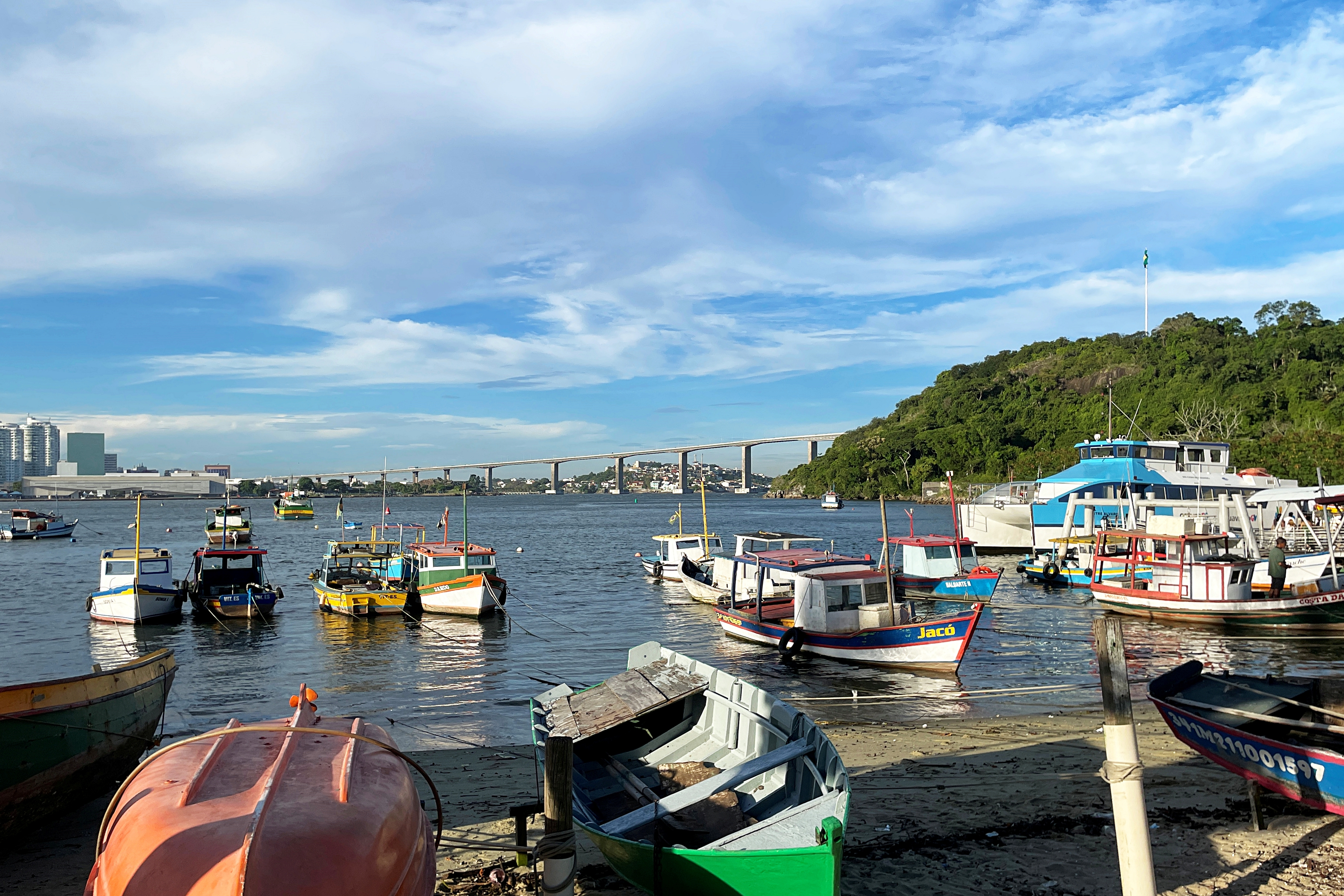
Boats at the Prainha

The nearest airport to Vila Velha is currently the Eurico de Aguiar Salles Airport (Goiabeiras Airport) in Vitória, the largest in Espírito Santo, which operates national and international flights, though only national flights for passengers. Since 2010, plans have been underway to construct a cargo airport in Vila Velha's rural area near Xury, close to the border with Guarapari. The runway for this cargo terminal would be 2,850 meters long, capable of handling national and international flights. Currently, the Espírito Santo Flying Club, one of Brazil's oldest flying clubs, operates in Vila Velha, offering theoretical and practical courses and leisure activities such as scenic flights over Greater Vitória, gliding, and parachuting.

Water transportation in the municipality is limited to activities at the Vila Velha Port Terminal, one of the busiest on the Brazilian coast, and fishing activities. According to 2012 city hall data, there were approximately 1,000 fishermen and 548 registered vessels. Fishing boat activity is most intense at the beaches of Ribeiro, Costa, Itapoã, Itaparica, Barra do Jucu, Ponta da Fruta, and Prainha, with most vessels powered by diesel or electric motors. Prainha also hosts the Prainha Water Terminal, used as a dock for fishing boats.

==== Rail and metro transportation ====
The first railway to reach Vila Velha was the "Coastal Line" of the Leopoldina Railway, connecting Vitória to Niterói in the Rio de Janeiro Metropolitan Region. The city's station was inaugurated on July 13, 1895, and served as a passenger terminal until the 1980s. Since then, the railway has been used solely for freight trains and has been managed by the Ferrovia Centro-Atlântica since 1996.

Another significant railway in the city is the Vitória-Minas Railway, linking Vitória to Belo Horizonte, the capital of Minas Gerais. The former São Carlos Station, later renamed Pedro Nolasco Station, located opposite the Vitória Bay, was originally opened on May 20, 1905, and renovated and reinaugurated on November 19, 1927, with its current eclectic architecture building. The station served as a passenger terminal until the 1960s, after which its functions were transferred to a temporary, simplified station and later to a new building in Cariacica, approximately 1 km from Vila Velha. Since 1942, the railway has been managed by the Companhia Vale do Rio Doce and is currently the only railway in Brazil to operate daily long-distance passenger transport. The former Pedro Nolasco Station building in Vila Velha was designated a Historical and Cultural Heritage site by the State Culture Council in 1986 and housed the Vale Museum from 1998 to 2025.

As in much of Brazil, the rise of road and air transportation contributed to the decline of railways, particularly in the first half of the 1990s. However, plans are in place for the construction of the South Coast Railway, which will connect Vitória and Vila Velha to Campos dos Goytacazes and the city of Rio de Janeiro, facilitating the transport of goods from various parts of the country to Espírito Santo's port terminals. Another project involving rail transport in Vila Velha is the establishment of a light rail system, which would serve not only the municipality but also the entire Greater Vitória area, addressing the region's urban mobility challenges.

==== Road transportation ====
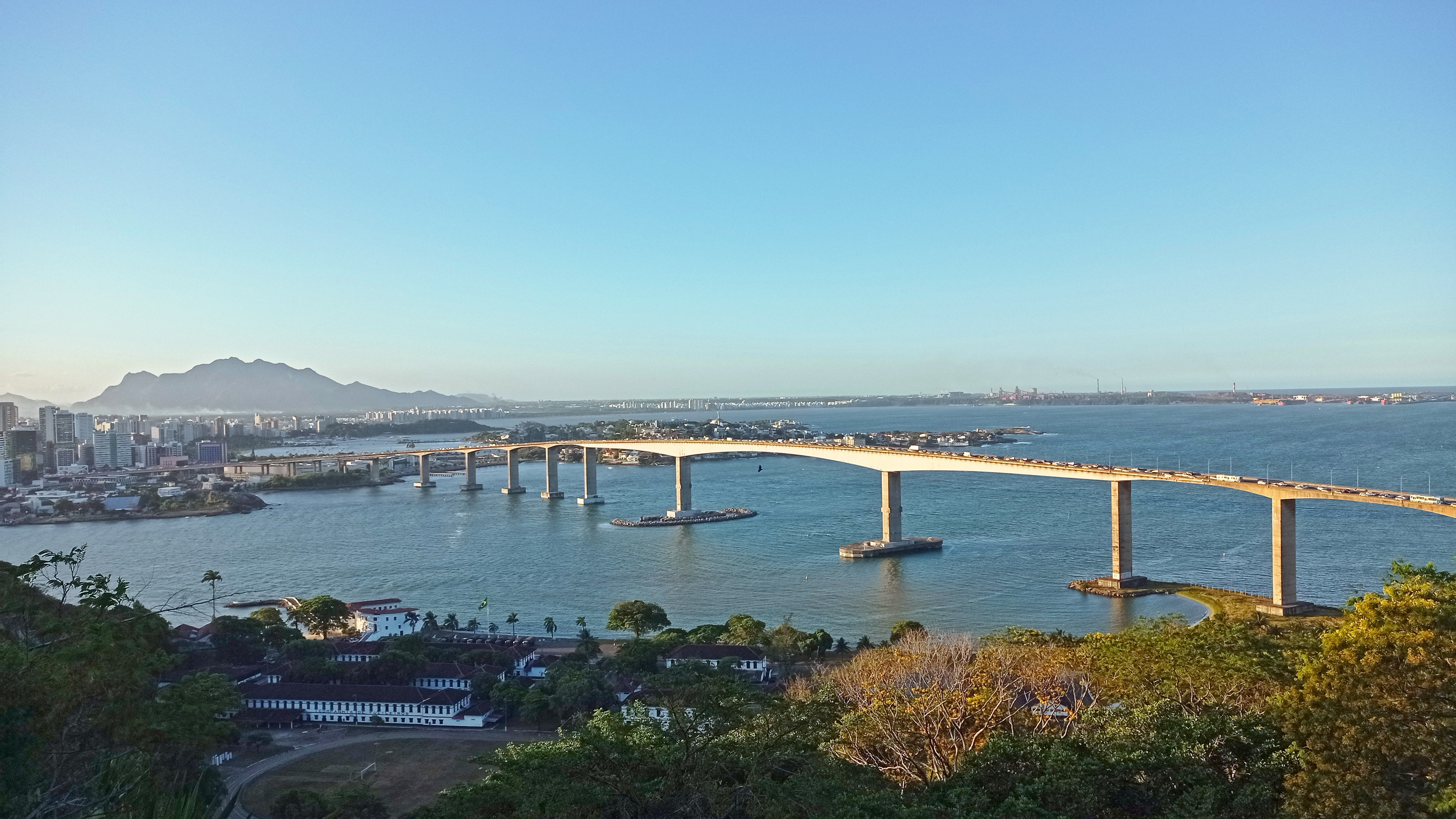
View of the Third Bridge, the main connection between Vila Velha and Vitória

Vila Velha has a well-developed road network connecting it to various cities in the state's interior and major metropolitan areas in the Southeast region of Brazil. The first connection to Vitória was the Florentino Avidos Bridge, built in the 1920s, but the Third Bridge, inaugurated in 1989, is now the primary access to the capital. It is managed by the Rodovia do Sol (ES-060), also known as Rodossol, which connects Vila Velha to cities along the state's southern coast. Other significant roads include the Darly Santos Highway, connecting the municipality to Cariacica; the BR-101, providing direct access to cities in Southern, Southeastern, and Northeastern Brazil; the ES-388, linking the urban area to the BR-101 and rural neighborhoods; and the Carlos Lindemberg Highway, starting in the Glória region and serving as another access route to Vitória, the metropolitan region, and the BR-262.

The Vila Velha Bus Terminal, officially named Darly Santos Bus Station, is located in the Itaparica neighborhood and is one of the largest in the state. It offers routes to destinations along Espírito Santo's southern coast, Rio de Janeiro, São Paulo, Belo Horizonte, and other major cities in Espírito Santo and neighboring states. The terminal was inaugurated on July 4, 2012, replacing the former station in the Coqueiral de Itaparica neighborhood.

==== Urban transportation ====
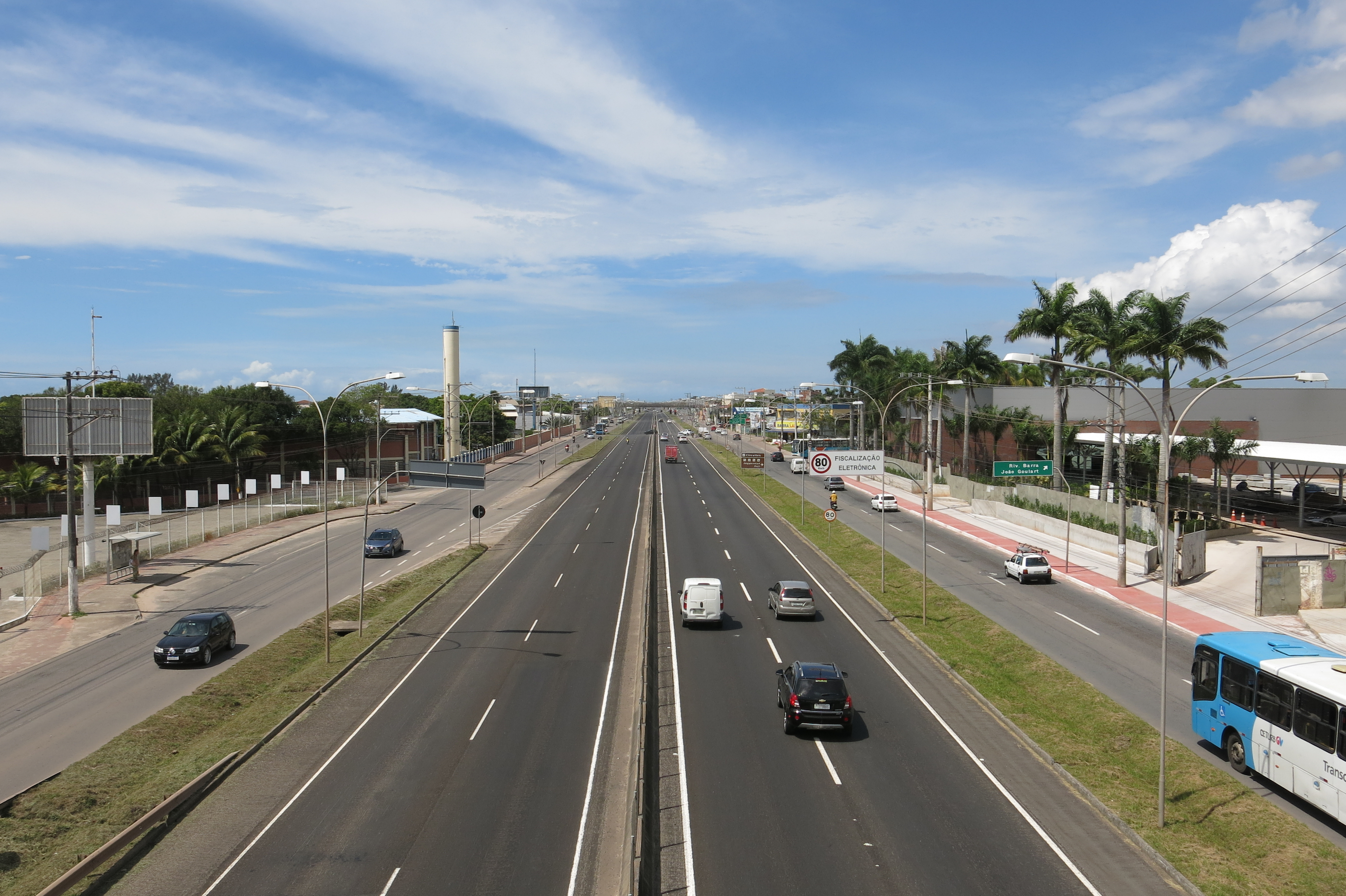
The Rodovia do Sol (Sun Highway) in Vila Velha

The Municipal Transportation and Traffic Secretariat oversees the control and maintenance of the municipality's traffic, including monitoring public roads, driver and pedestrian behavior, developing traffic engineering projects, paving, constructing road infrastructure, and managing services such as taxis, alternative transport, buses, chartered vehicles, and school transport. The city has two types of urban transportation: municipal, operated by the Sanremo company, which connects the main neighborhoods within the municipality, and the Transcol System, which links Vila Velha to five other municipalities in Greater Vitória.

In 2010, the municipal vehicle fleet consisted of 157,667 vehicles, including 99,911 automobiles, 3,853 trucks, 964 truck tractors, 9,339 pickups, 5,746 vans, 701 minibuses, 24,981 motorcycles, 5,305 mopeds, 786 buses, 128 wheeled tractors, 1,227 utility vehicles, and 4,726 other vehicle types. Duplicated and paved avenues and numerous traffic lights facilitate city traffic, but the increase in the number of vehicles over the past decade has led to increasingly slow traffic, particularly in areas accessing the Third Bridge.

To alleviate congestion, the city hall has invested in projects such as the "bicycle network," creating a cycling ring around the city, connecting the entire Vila Velha waterfront to the city center with over 32 km of bike paths. This reduces the flow of cyclists and pedestrians on some of the city's main avenues.

== Culture ==
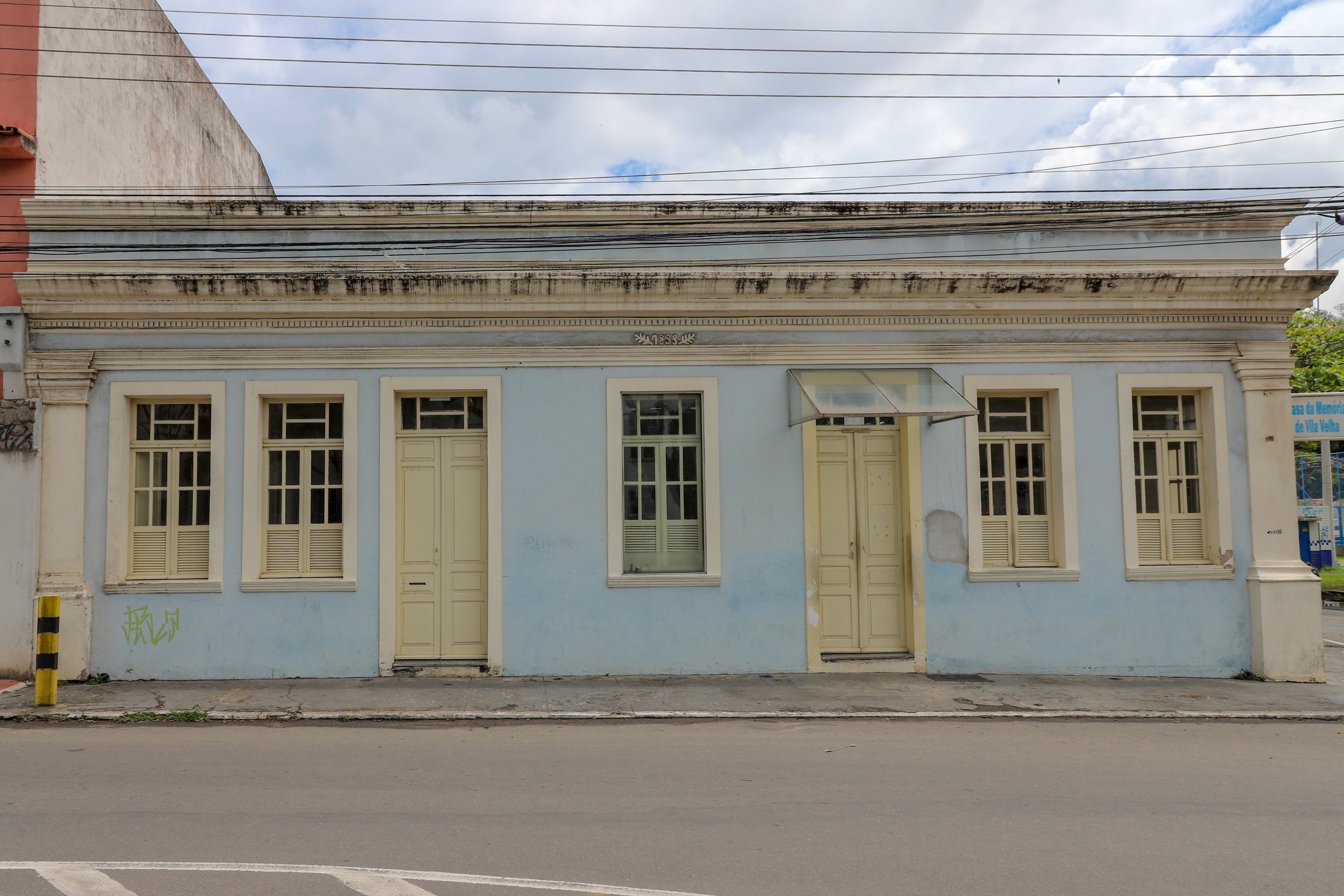
House of Memory of Vila Velha Museum

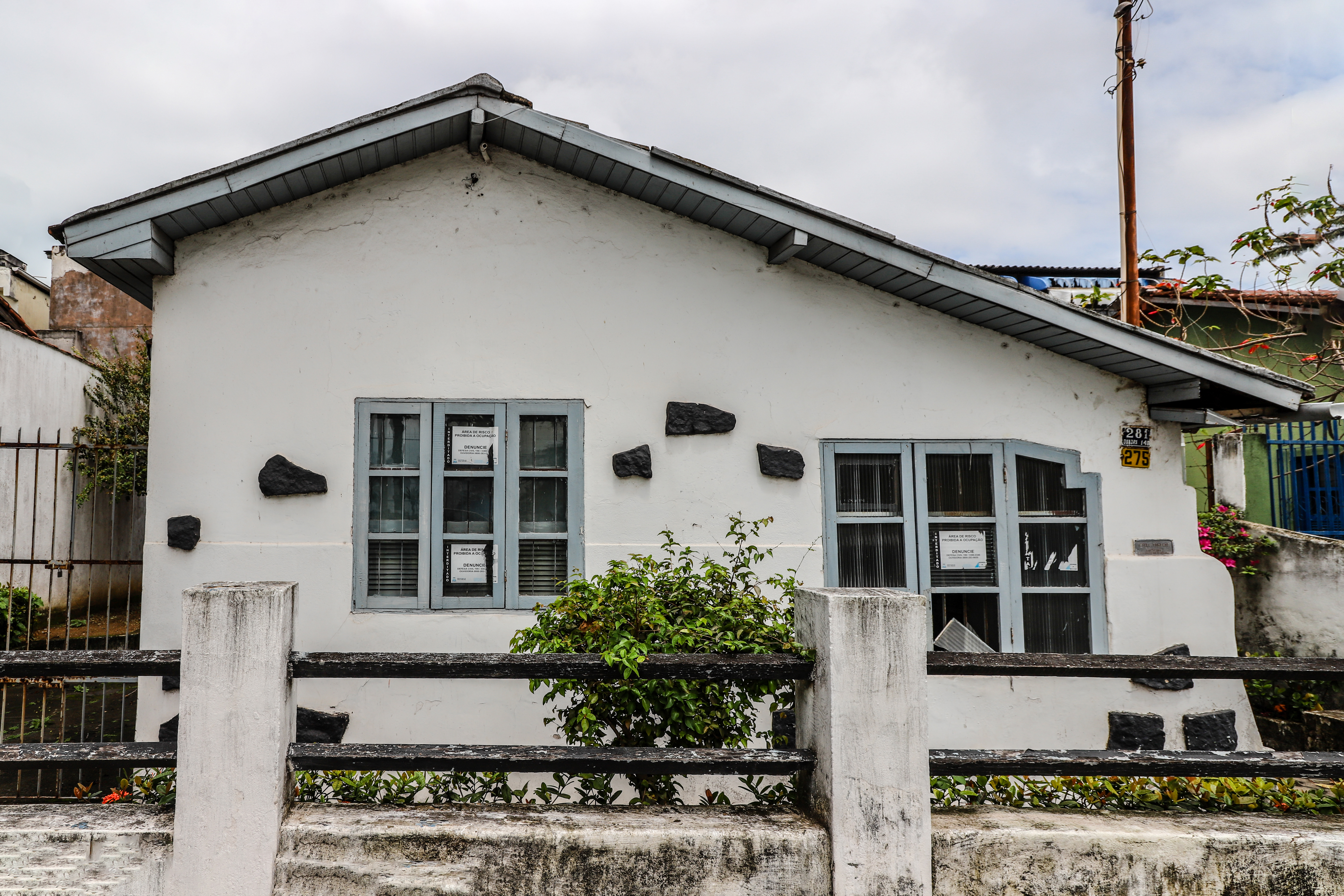
Homero Massena Museum

The cultural sector of Vila Velha is overseen by the municipal Secretariat of Culture and Tourism, which aims to promote tourism in the city and to plan and implement the municipality's cultural policies through the development of programs, projects, and activities that foster cultural development and social inclusion. The Secretariat of Sports and Leisure also manages specific aspects of Vila Velha's cultural landscape, such as leisure activities and sports practices. It supports and encourages sports in Vila Velha and develops and executes initiatives dedicated to this sector.

The establishment of the Vila Velha Culture and Art Law (Law 4,573, enacted on 13 November 2007) provided tax incentives for cultural projects that promote artistic and cultural expressions in the city and strengthen the processes and structures of creative production. According to the municipality, from 2009 to 2012, approximately 200 projects benefited from this law, including book and CD launches, the production of documentaries, theater plays, and films, as well as activities related to crafts and visual arts, among others.

=== Notable figures ===
Vila Velha is the birthplace of several artists who have achieved national or international recognition. These include model Débora Lyra, who was crowned Miss Minas Gerais 2010, Miss Brasil 2010 representing Minas Gerais, and Top Model of the World 2009 representing Brazil; actor and singer Chay Suede, one of the six protagonists of the telenovela Rebelde, which led to the formation of the band Rebeldes (of which he was also a member), receiving awards such as the Capricho Awards in 2011 and 2012 and the 2012 Brazilian Youth Award, and currently performing as a solo singer; and singer, songwriter, presenter, actress, and voice actress Jullie.

Several notable bands also originated in the city. The reggae band "Salvação" was founded in March 1996, and its debut album, "Altas Ondas Astrais," released in January 1999, sold over 15,000 copies. Casaca blends pop rock, rock, and reggae, originating in Barra do Jucu. Their first CD sold over 55,000 copies across Brazil. Mukeka di Rato, formed in 1995 in the genres of punk rock and hardcore punk, has performed at international festivals in countries such as Japan, the United States, and Sweden, and won an edition of the VMB award from MTV Brasil. The Macucos, also in the reggae genre, were formed in 1999 but gained national prominence after 2002, when they were noticed by music producer Liminha, who helped them secure a contract with Sony Music Entertainment. Rastaclone has been active since 1997, performing in reggae and rock styles. In the gospel music scene, the alternative metal band Polyphone stands out.

=== Performing arts and events ===
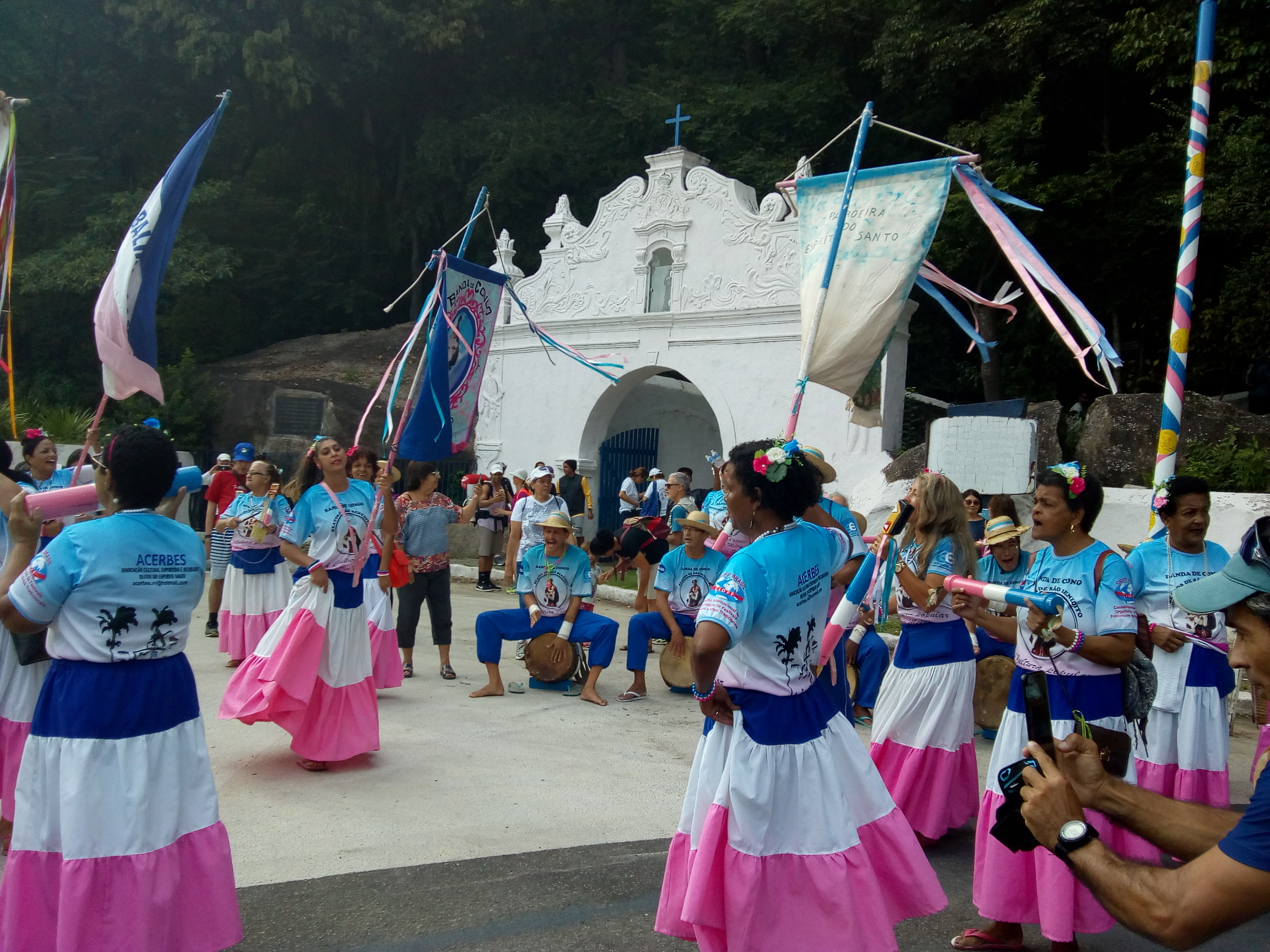
Presentation of a congo band, 2019.

Theater has been a part of Vila Velha since the colonial period. Historical records indicate that plays written by Jesuits were performed in the late 16th century, such as the staging of "Na Visitação de Santa Izabel" (1597), authored by Father Joseph of Anchieta. Street theater was common during that era and regained significant popularity in Vila Velha throughout the 20th century. Today, the city boasts several venues dedicated to cultural events in theater and music. The Élio Vianna Municipal Theater, originally the municipal headquarters designed in 1960 by architect Élio Vianna, was converted into a theater in 1992 and now has a capacity of over 300 people, including 10 private boxes. The Marista School Theater has a capacity of 480 people and is part of a sports and cultural complex that includes a gymnasium, a hall, and covered courts.

The city also hosts several theater festivals. One of the most prominent is the Children's Theater Festival, held annually since 1999. Various children's plays are performed by theater companies from across Espírito Santo and Brazil, with actors engaging interactively with the audience, primarily children. Although the festival is centered in Vila Velha, some performances also take place in Vitória. The 2011 edition attracted 25,926 attendees and featured 72 theater sessions. Additionally, the Dance Festival, organized by the Marista School Theater since 2011, and the Art Everywhere Week, also held by the Marista Theater since 2011, feature parades, theatrical performances, musicals, and dance shows. The Experimental Amateur Theater Group (Geta), in partnership with the Municipal Secretariat of Culture, periodically organizes theater projects with free acting workshops offered to the public.

In addition to theatrical events, Vila Velha hosts other significant cultural celebrations, including the Carnival of Vila Velha, featuring parades by various samba schools and live performances; the Feast of Penha, honoring Our Lady of Peñafrancia, established by Friar Pedro Palácios and considered the third largest religious festival in Brazil, attracting thousands of Catholics and tourists for processions, pilgrimages, and religious performances in the city streets and at the Penha Convent; the city's anniversary, celebrated with concerts and civic parades, officially on 23 May, though festivities span a week; the Chocolate Festival, held since 2009, showcasing the works and creations of Chocolates Garoto, one of the largest events of its kind in Brazil, attracting up to 180,000 visitors in some editions and selling around 800 kilograms of chocolate; Vila Velha Summer, integrated with the Independent Bands Festival, a series of events featuring cultural workshops, craft exhibitions, and performances by regional bands to promote their work; and New Year's Eve, featuring performances by regional or nationally known artists and fireworks displays at various points in the city. In the gospel scene, the Jesus Vida Verão stands out, featuring performances by various evangelical artists, both regional and nationally recognized, held annually since 1992.

=== Attractions ===
==== Historical heritage and architectural landmarks ====
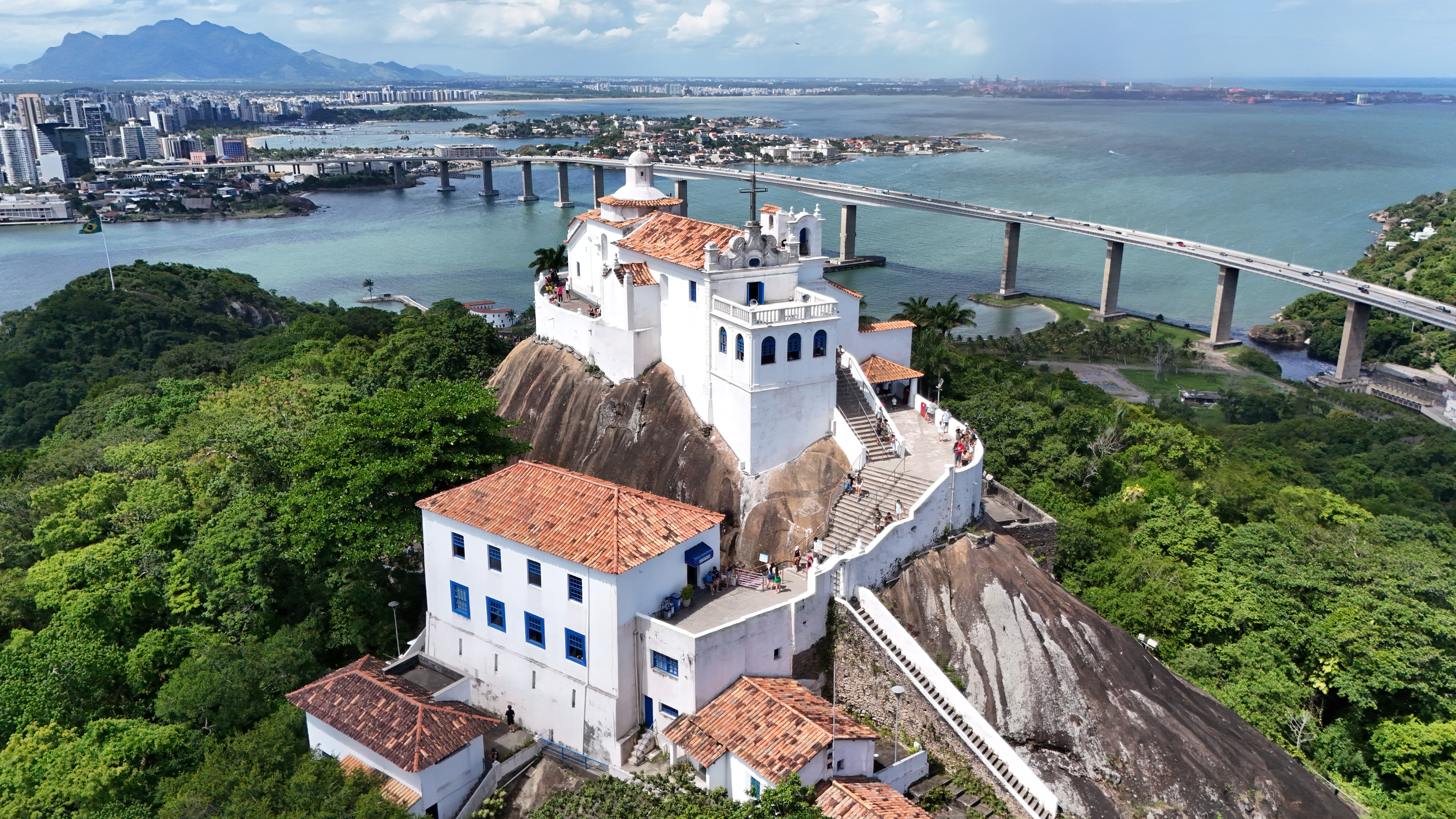
View of the Penha Convent with the Third Bridge in the background

Vila Velha is home to a wide array of attractions with significant architectural and historical value. The most prominent is the Penha Convent, perched atop a 154-meter-high cliff, one of the oldest churches in Espírito Santo, with construction beginning around 1558 under the direction of Friar Pedro Palácios. It was designated a cultural heritage site by the National Institute of Historic and Artistic Heritage (Iphan) in 1943. Much of the interior is clad in cedar wood, carved by Portuguese sculptor José Fernandes Pereira between 1874 and 1879. The high altar, now comprising over 200 pieces made from 19 different types of marble, was built around 1800 in the Rococo style, undergoing restorations in 1910 and again between January 2009 and 17 December 2011.

The convent complex spans an area of 632,226 square meters, encompassing various monuments and attractions, such as the Friar Pedro Palácios Grotto, a natural cavity in the cliff where the convent stands, believed by some historians to have been the friar's first residence. In 1562, he built a chapel dedicated to Saint Francis of Assisi, now located in the area known as the convent square (Campinho). In the late 20th century, a museum and a shop selling food and small gifts were added. From the convent, visitors can enjoy panoramic views of Vila Velha, Vitória, and, in the distance, the Atlantic Ocean.

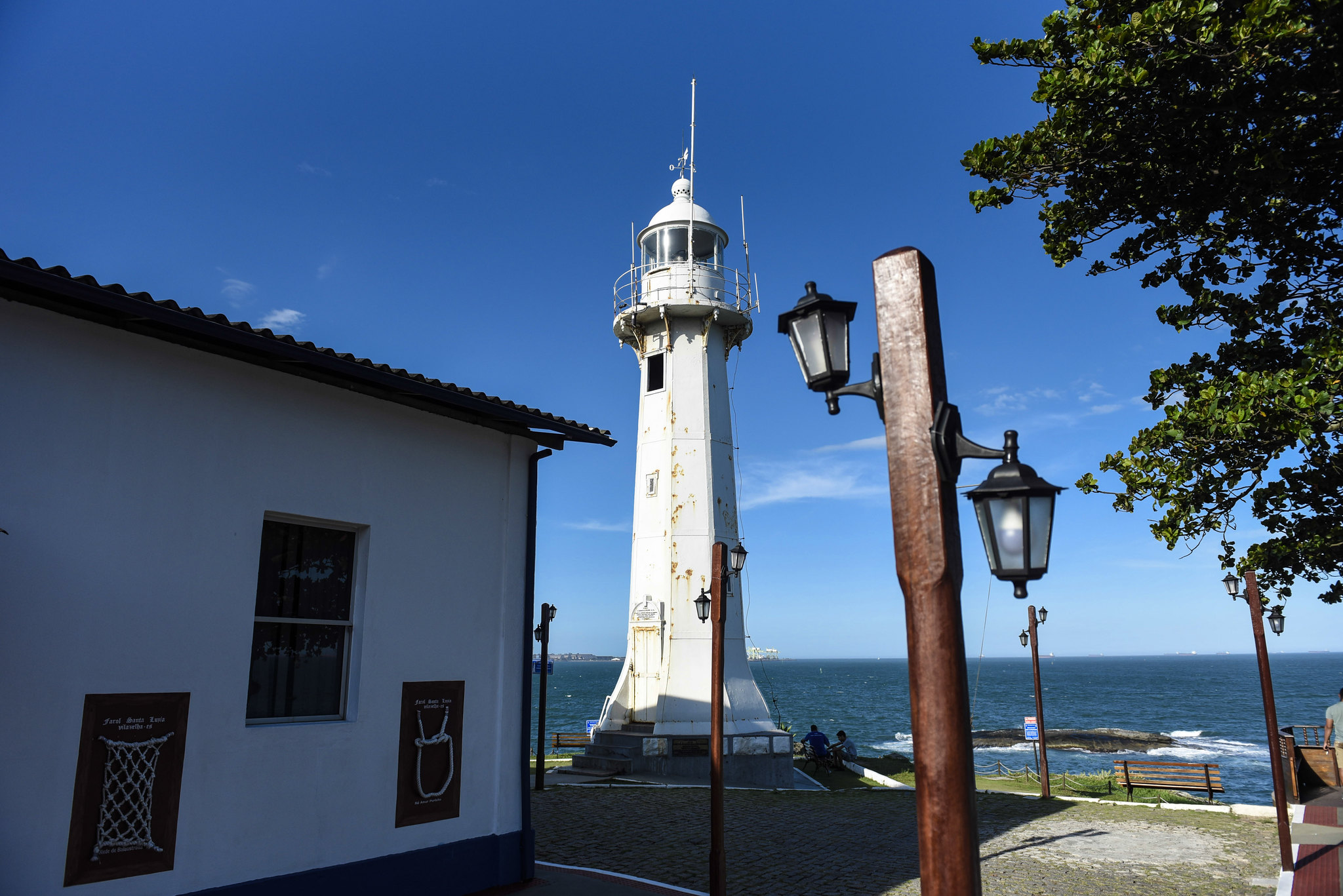
Santa Luzia Lighthouse

Beyond the convent, several other attractions stand out in the city. The Prainha Historical Site is a complex that combines historical landmarks with new constructions built on reclaimed land. It includes the 38th Infantry Battalion, the Espírito Santo Apprentice Sailors School, the Fort of São Francisco Xavier de Piratininga, the Homero Massena Museum, the Church of Our Lady of the Rosary, the obelisk to Vasco Fernandes Coutinho, the Flag Square, and the Memory House Museum, which houses valuable documents related to the municipality's colonization.

The Divine Holy Spirit Sanctuary, built in 1956 by Dom José Joaquim Gonçalves and inaugurated on 21 April 1967, is considered one of the largest of its kind in Brazil. The Madalena Bridge, constructed in 1896, connects the Jacarenema reserve to Barra do Jucu Beach. It is named after the Barra do Jucu Congo Band, made famous by the song "Madalena do Jucu" by Martinho da Vila. The Vale Museum, originally the Pedro Nolasco Station built in 1927, now houses a collection featuring a historic steam locomotive, a wooden carriage, a trolley, a telegraph, photographs, and more. The Santa Luzia Lighthouse, built in 1870, stands at the end of Praia da Costa. It measures 12 meters in height with a 9-square-meter base, and its 3,000-watt light reaches 17 nautical miles.

==== Beaches ====
Vila Velha boasts over 30 kilometers of coastline, with the municipality's main beaches being:

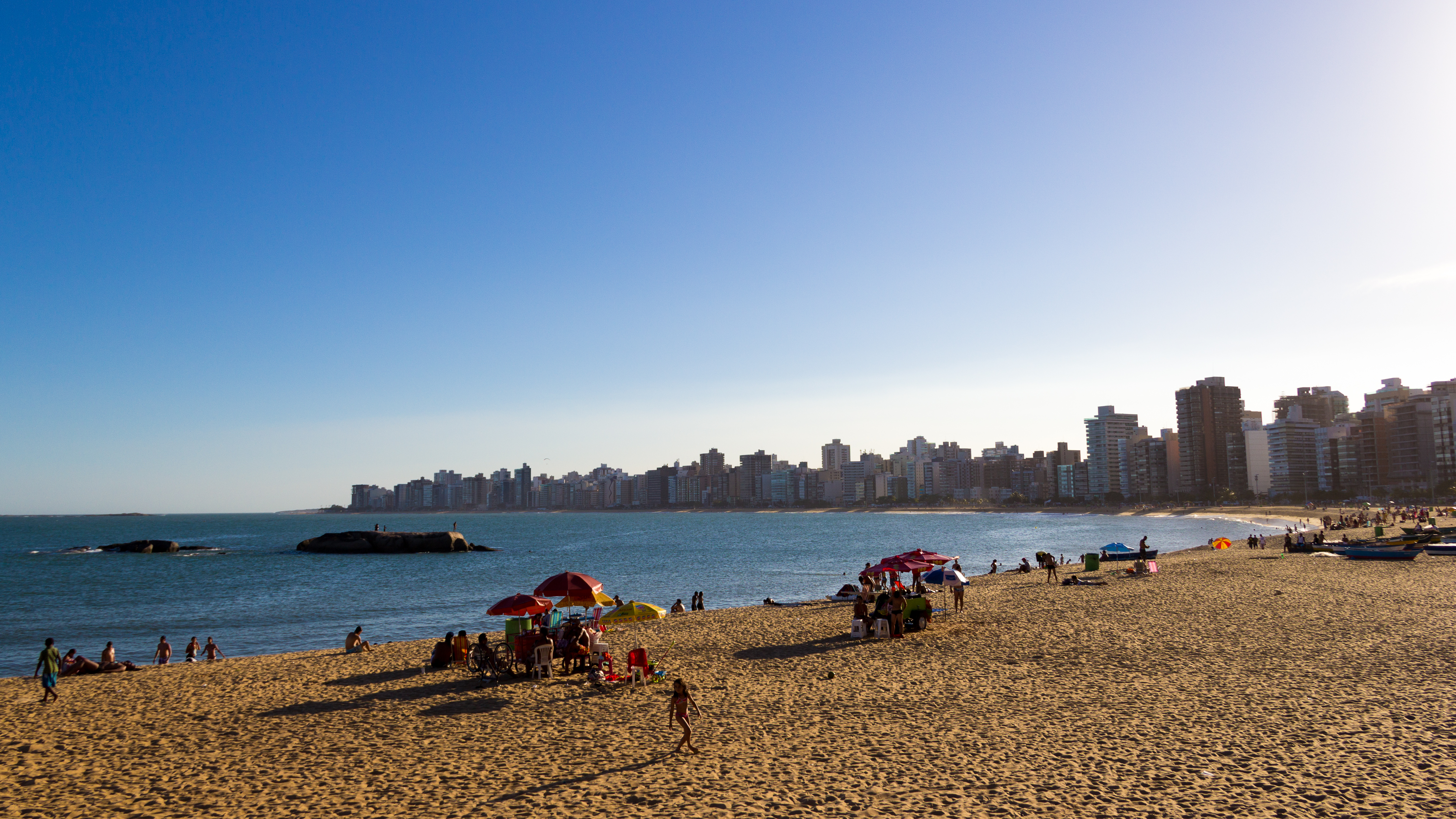
Costa Beach

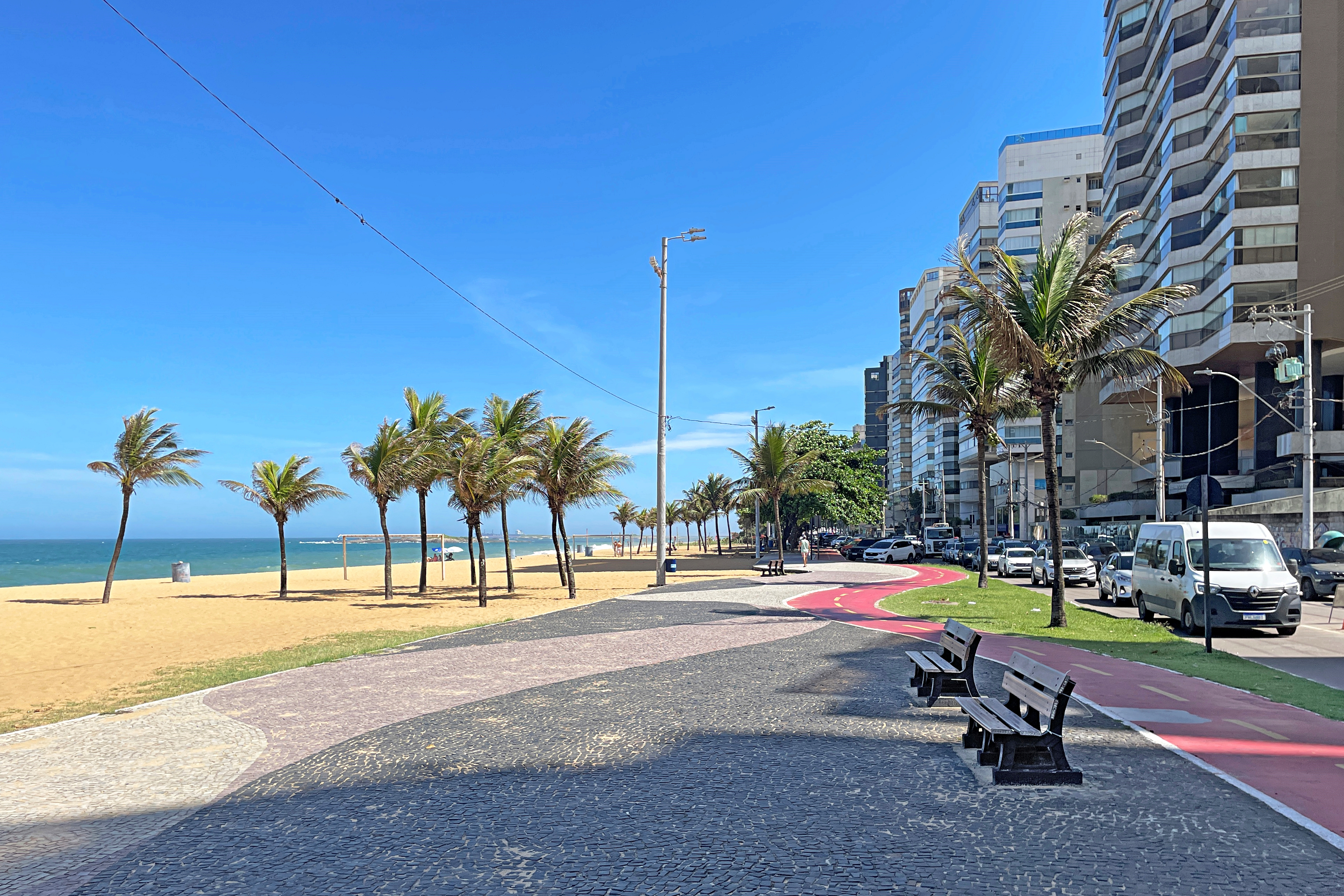
Itapoã Beach

- Barra do Jucu: A small resort located 15 kilometers from downtown Vila Velha, this former fishing village retains its village character. Situated near the mouth of the Jucu River, it attracts visitors in the late afternoon to witness the flight of herons. The area features numerous beaches, popular among surfers and sports enthusiasts, and hosts surfing championships, some at the national level.
- Praia da Barrinha: Located on the left bank of the Jucu River's mouth, 12 km from downtown Vila Velha, access is via the Madalena Bridge, built in 1896. The river mouth is a hub for fishing activities.
- Praia da Concha: A 70-meter stretch of sand behind Concha Hill, also near the Jucu River's mouth, it is primarily used for diving due to minimal wave activity.
- Praia da Costa: Considered the city's busiest beach and one of the most well-known in Espírito Santo, it is surrounded by high-end buildings, numerous restaurants, and hotels. Located less than three kilometers from downtown Vila Velha, it features a lighting system that allows for nighttime swimming and sports.
- Praia de Itaparica: Adjacent to Praia da Costa, it is considered an extension of it but with waves more suitable for surfing. It also features a higher concentration of bars and kiosks along its boardwalk.
- Praia de Itapoã: Another extension of Praia da Costa, it is closely monitored from May to September during the breeding season of yellow-billed and red-billed terns, species native to the area. Boats for tours are also available.
- Praia de Piratininga: Located near the 38th Infantry Battalion of the Brazilian Army.
- Ponta da Fruta Resort: Comprising beaches, freshwater lagoons, and restaurants, it is located near the border with Guarapari. Originally a fishing village, it is now dominated by guesthouses and camping areas.
- Prainha: Situated between the 38th Infantry Battalion and the Espírito Santo Apprentice Sailors School, it is the site where Vila Velha's founding was declared in 1535. It houses a waterway terminal, widely used as a dock for fishing boats.
- Praia do Ribeiro: A 200-meter stretch of sand between Morro do Moreno and the Santa Luzia Lighthouse, it was the residence of Portuguese nobleman Vasco Fernandes Coutinho, the first grantee of the Captaincy of Espírito Santo. It is used for walks but is not recommended for swimming.

=== Sports ===
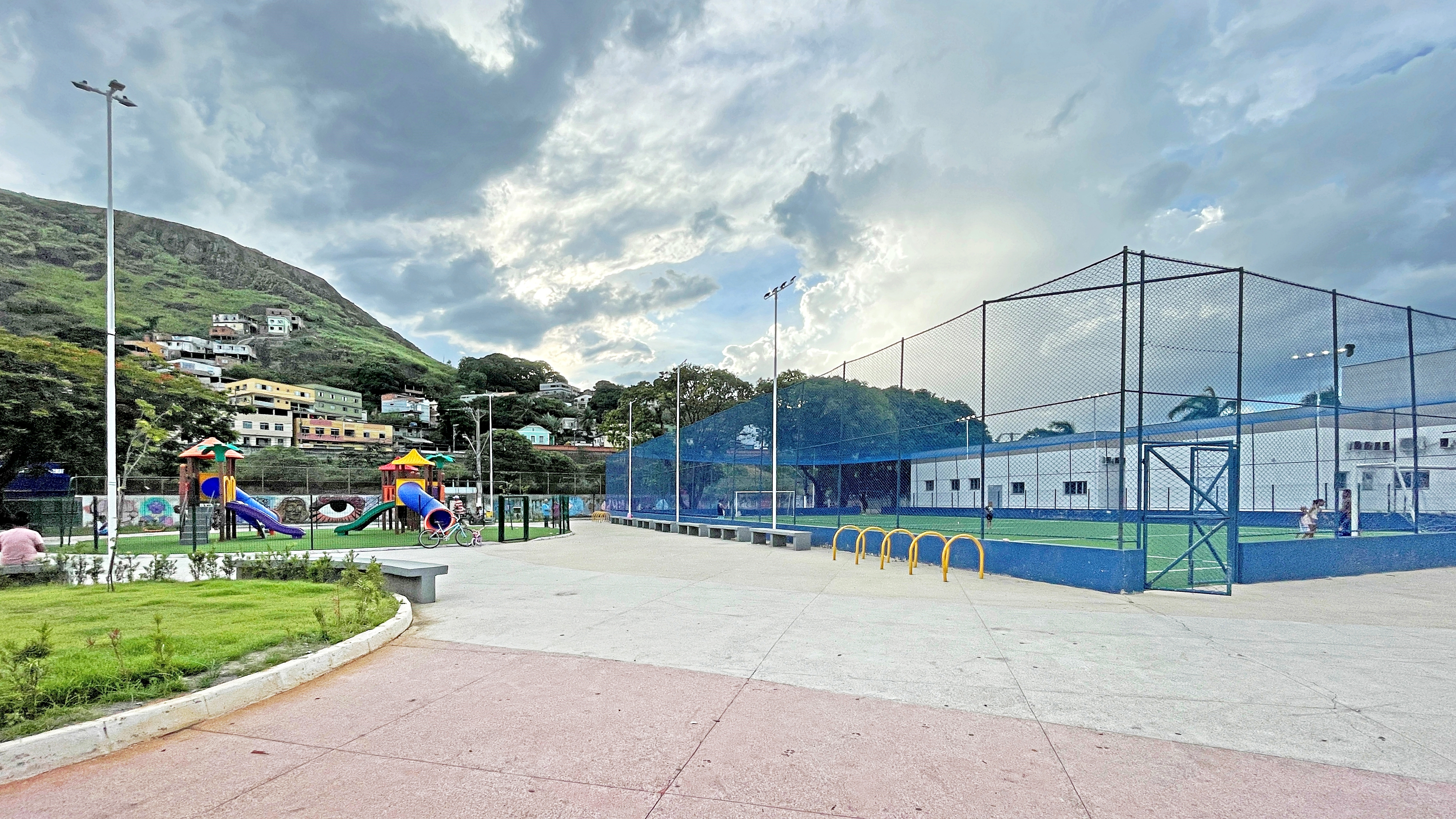
Sports area and playground in the Paul

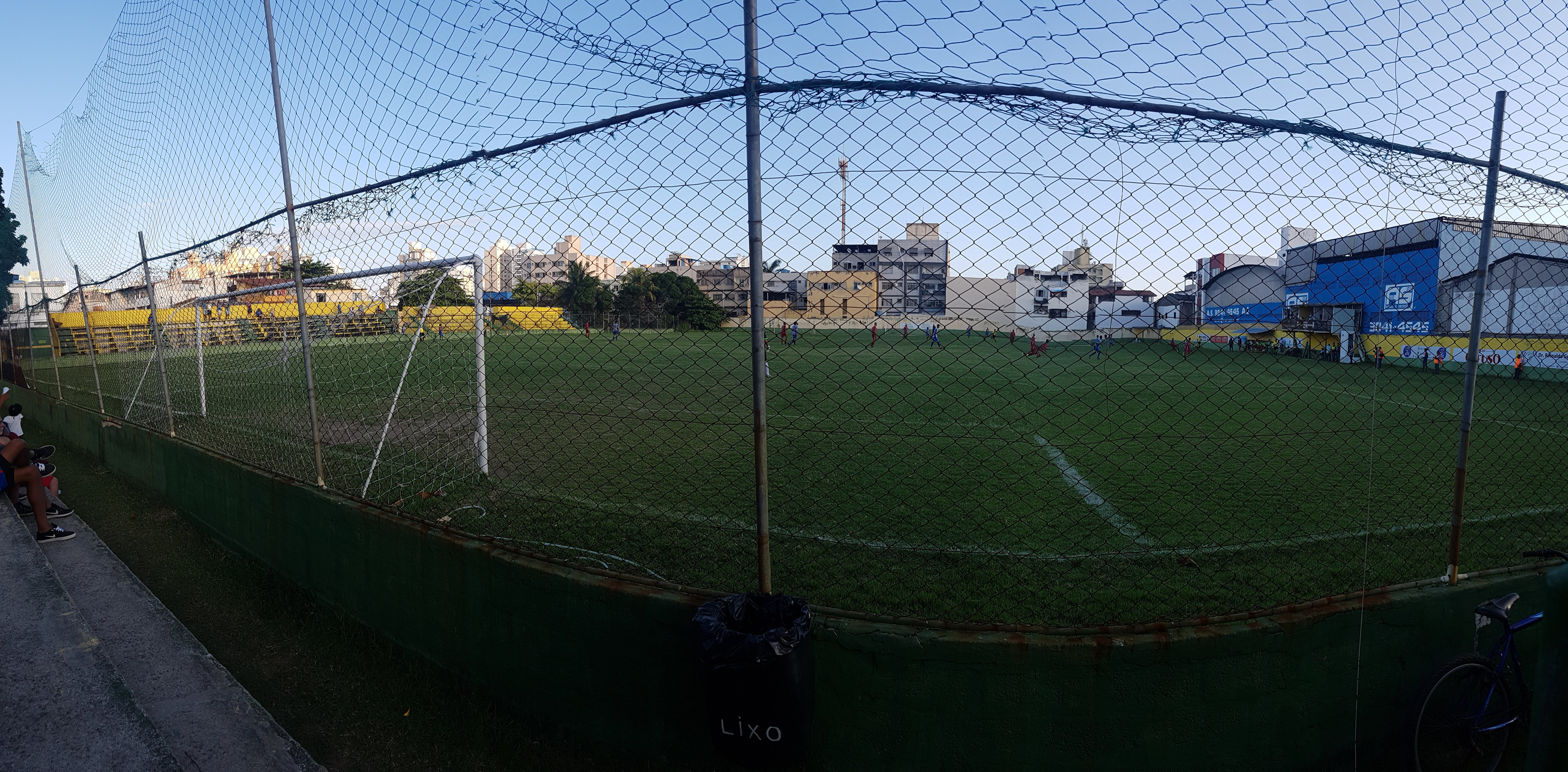
View of the Gil Bernardes da Silveira Stadium

The city is home to several sports clubs, most of which have regional or, at most, state-level prominence. The main ones are the Vilavelhense Futebol Clube, founded on 26 August 2002; the Esporte Clube Tupy, one of the oldest in the municipality, founded in October 1938 and officially professionalized in 1988; and the women's football team Vila Nova Futebol Clube, founded in 2007 and the first champion of the Espírito Santo Women's Football Championship in 2010.

The city's main football stadiums are the Gil Bernardes da Silveira Stadium, home to Tupy, inaugurated in 1938 with a capacity for over 1,000 people; the SESI Araçás Stadium, home to Vilavelhense, built in 1996 with a capacity of 1,500 people; and the Glória Stadium, which has been used for training by Clube de Regatas do Flamengo. Several neighborhoods in the city have reasonably equipped football fields, some with synthetic turf, bleachers, and fencing.

In addition to football, Vila Velha offers numerous facilities for other sports. Centro de Treinamento Arremessando para o Futuro (Vila Velha/Garoto/UVV) is the city's main basketball team, founded in May 2000, with its home at the João Goulart Municipal Gymnasium, which has a capacity of up to 3,500 people. The Espírito Santo Tennis League, established in May 2005, organizes its own tennis circuit in the state and oversees the sport's practice. Teams and championships also exist for sports such as futsal, volleyball, footvolley, American football, rhythmic gymnastics, and boxing.

Surfing is popular on some beaches, particularly at Barra do Jucu and Praia de Itaparica, where wave conditions support official tournaments and championships. Beach volleyball is also prominent, with the city occasionally hosting official national championships. The Espírito Santo Flying Club offers flights for parachuting over the city.

=== Holidays ===
In Vila Velha, there are four municipal holidays, established by Law 1,118 of 30 May 1967 (in accordance with Federal Decree 86 of 27 December 1966), eight national holidays, two state holidays, and several optional holidays. The municipal holidays are Good Friday, in March or April; the Day of Our Lady of Penha, celebrated on 8 April; the city's anniversary on 23 May (also recognized as the Day of Espírito Santo Soil Colonization, a state holiday); and Corpus Christi. According to Federal Law No. 9,093, enacted on 12 September 1995, municipalities may have up to four religious municipal holidays, including Good Friday.

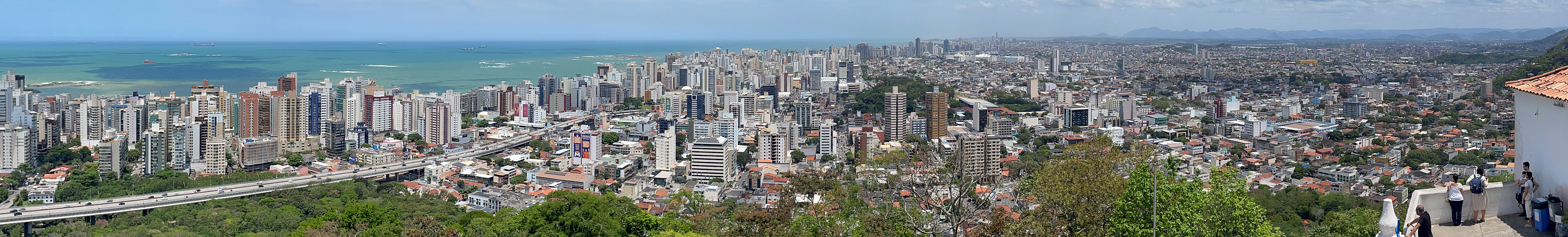
Panoramic view of Vila Velha from the Penha Convent

== Notable people ==
- Sávio — Brazilian football player
- André Stein - Brazilian beach volleyball player
- Francielly Pereira — Brazilian group rhythmic gymnast
- Pâmella Oliveira - Brazilian triathlete.
- Chay Suede - Brazilian actor and singer-songwriter

== See also ==
- Church of Our Lady of the Rosary
- Prainha Historic Site
- Fort of São Francisco Xavier de Piratininga
- Memory House Museum
- List of municipalities in Espírito Santo
- Municipalities of Brazil
- People from Vila Velha
