= List of museums in Brazil =

This is a list of museums in Brazil.

- Cabangu Museum
- Catete Palace
- Cultural Complex of the Republic
- Educational Museum Gama D'Eça
- Ema Gordon Klabin Cultural Foundation
- Eva Klabin Foundation
- Galeria de Artes Álvaro Santos
- House of the Seven Lamps (Portuguese: Casa dos Sete Candeeiros)
- Ilha Fiscal
- Imperial Museum of Brazil
- Mariano Procópio Museum
- Museu Aeroespacial
- Museu de Arte de Ribeirão Preto
- Museu do Estado de Pernambuco
- Museu do Índio
- Museu Entomológico Fritz Plaumann
- Museum of Art of the Parliament of São Paulo
- Museum of Contemporary Art, University of São Paulo
- Museum of Life
- Museum of Modern Art of Bahia
- Museum of Science and Technology (PUCRS)
- Museum of the Portuguese Language
- Museum of Veterinary Anatomy FMVZ USP (Portuguese: Museu de Anatomia Veterinária Prof. Dr. Plínio Pinto e Silva)
- Museu Nacional de Belas Artes
- Museum Vincente Pallotti
- Museu Paulista
- Museu Rodin Bahia
- National Historical Museum (Brazil)
- National Museum of Brazil
- Niterói Contemporary Art Museum
- Pinacoteca do Estado de São Paulo
- Ricardo Brennand Institute
- São Paulo Museum of Art
- São Paulo Museum of Modern Art
- Santa Catarina Art Museum
- Schmitt-Presser Museum
- Solar Monjardim Museum
- Wings of a Dream Museum

== See also ==
- Brazilian Institute of Museums
- List of archives in Brazil
- List of museums by country
