= Church of Our Lady of the Rosary (Vila Velha) =

Catholic temple in Espírito Santo, Brazil

- Igreja de Nossa Senhora do Rosário
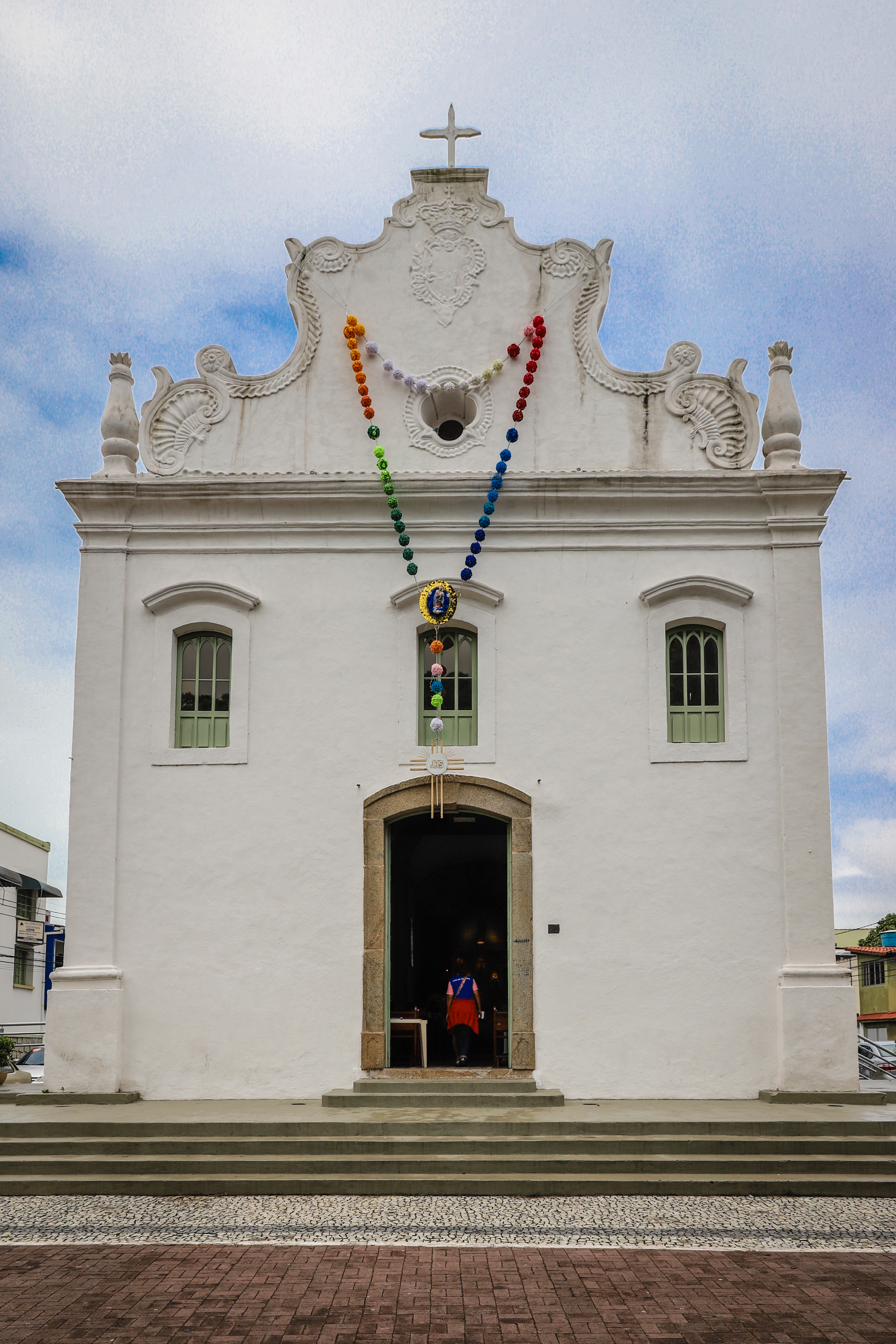
- Church of Our Lady of the Rosary
- 20°19′50.48″S 40°17′31.6″W
- Location: Vila Velha, Espírito Santo; Brazil

History
- Founded: 16th century

The Church of Our Lady of the Rosary (Portuguese: Igreja de Nossa Senhora do Rosário) is a Catholic temple located in the Prainha Historic Site, in the municipality of Vila Velha, in the state of Espírito Santo. It is considered one of the oldest churches in Brazil and a landmark of the colonization of the territory of Espírito Santo.

== History ==
The Church of Our Lady of the Rosary is the result of the extension of the oldest chapel built in the Captaincy of Espírito Santo, which was erected by its first donatário, Vasco Fernandes Coutinho, in 1535. Some claim it is the oldest in operation in Brazil although, according to IPHAN, this title belongs to the Church of St. Cosmas and St. Damian, located in the municipality of Igarassu, in Pernambuco. Also dating back to 1535, the temple of Pernambuco still retains its original form today, although it no longer holds masses.

The construction of the church's current shape was finished in 1551 with the help of Jesuit priests, who arrived in Espírito Santo in 1550. Initially, they settled in Vila Velha, since Coutinho had not yet transferred the seat of the captaincy to Vitória.

There used to be other prominent buildings around it. One of them is the Santa Casa de Misericórdia, which dates back to 1595 and was later transferred to Vitória. Another element was the cemetery of the colonial village, where the donatory Vasco Fernandes Coutinho was buried, but was removed around 1915.

== Characteristics ==
The IPHAN report reviews the Church of the Rosary.

It has a rectangular floor plan and features a nave, choir and chancel. In the nave with three altars, there is a baptismal font in lioz marble and a wooden ceiling in the shape of a tripartite prism. Its hydraulic tile floor bears witness to the various alterations the church has undergone throughout its history.

The Church of Our Lady of the Rosary is the only temple in America that preserves the history of the padroado and keeps the document of donation of the holy relics of St. Columbus and St. Liberato.

== Visitors ==
In the early years, the church was visited by Friar Pedro Palácios, who founded the Penha Convent, and by Father Joseph of Anchieta, who lived in Espírito Santo for several years towards the end of his life.

Emperor Pedro II's diaries show that he visited the church during his trip to Espírito Santo in 1860. However, he wrote very little about it, merely making notes:

The Parish Church that hasn't had a vicar for a long time.

== Protection and renovations ==
The Church of Our Lady of the Rosary has undergone numerous renovations. In 1908, the current altars were installed and in 1912, the structure was reinforced due to the installation of the streetcar line. On March 20, 1950, it was listed as a historical heritage site by the National Institute of Historic and Artistic Heritage (IPHAN) because of its historical, cultural and religious value to Brazil.

Since then, the church has been renovated several times to preserve its original colors and decorations. In 1980, the entire wooden structure of the choir was removed and replaced with a new one made of reinforced concrete.

Between 2015 and 2016, the structure was repaired, the plaster was treated, accessibility was adapted and the ornaments and decorative elements were restored. In this renovation, the most significant aspect was the historic restoration of the artistic paintings, the return of the wooden choir, the complete remodeling and partial replacement of the roof, the restoration of the ceiling and the installation of new electrical and sound systems and internal and external lighting. In 2021, its exterior was repainted.

== See also ==
- Captaincy of Espírito Santo
- Penha Convent
- Chapel of Saint Lucy
- History of Espírito Santo
