= Prainha Historic Site =

Historic location in Espirito Santo, Brazil

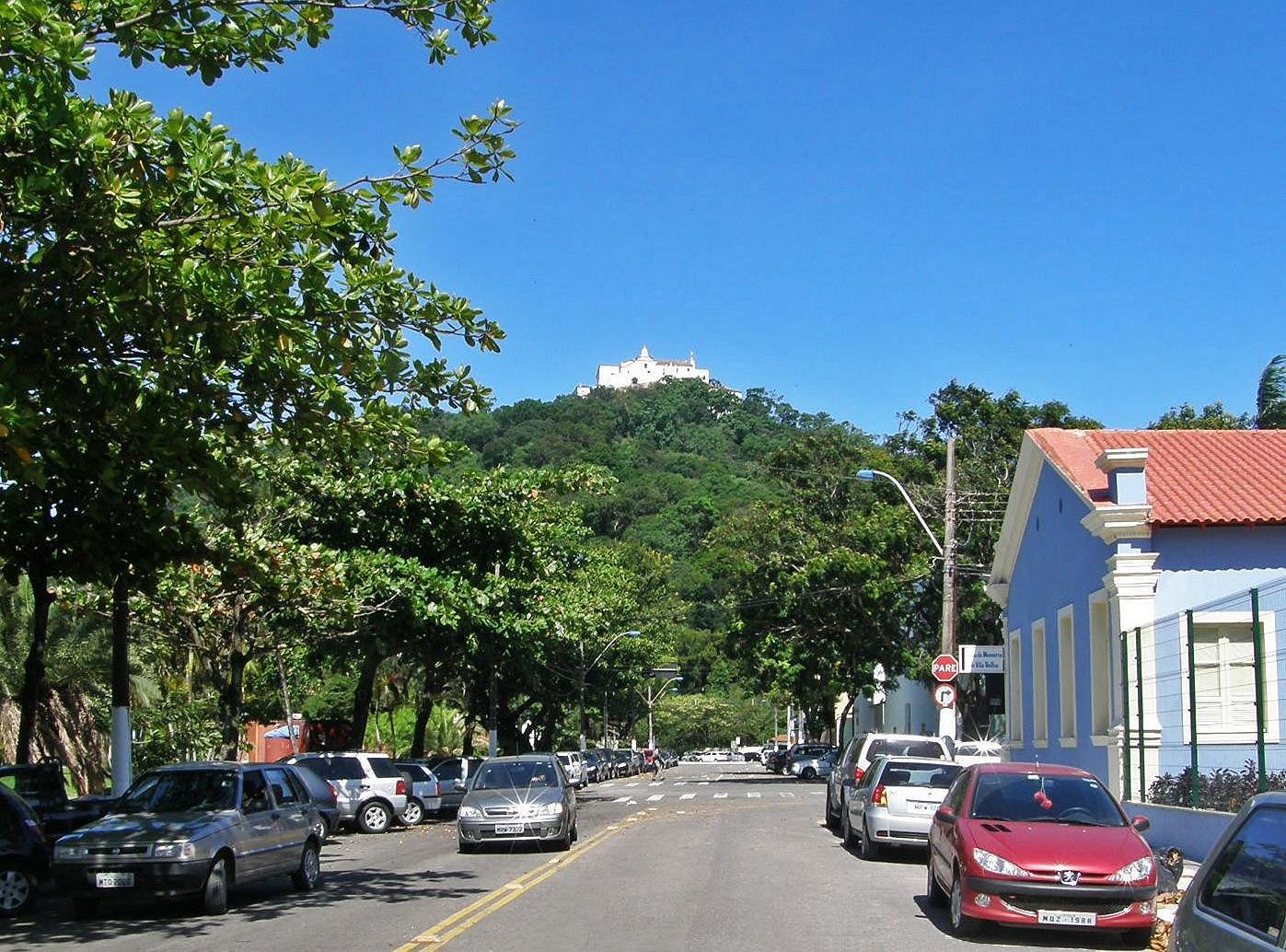
- Prainha Historic Site in Vila Velha, overlooking the Penha Convent.

- Location within Brazil
- 20.3293°S 40.2920°W
- Location: Vila Velha, Espírito Santo, Brazil

The Prainha Historic Site, in Vila Velha, Espírito Santo, Brazil, is the place where the Portuguese first landed when the territory was known as the Captaincy of Espírito Santo, on May 23, 1535. Currently, the site is home to several monuments and heritage monuments important to the state's history.

== History ==
According to historiography, the Captaincy of Espírito Santo was granted to Vasco Fernandes Coutinho in 1534. However, he only landed in the area on May 23, 1535, probably in the Prainha region.

The Church of Our Lady of the Rosary was the first building on the site, whose construction began in 1535 at Coutinho's request. The occupation of the seat of the captaincy, Vila do Espírito Santo, as Vila Velha was initially called, expanded from there. A few years later, however, the Portuguese moved the headquarters to the village of Vitória, newly founded on an island opposite Vila Velha.

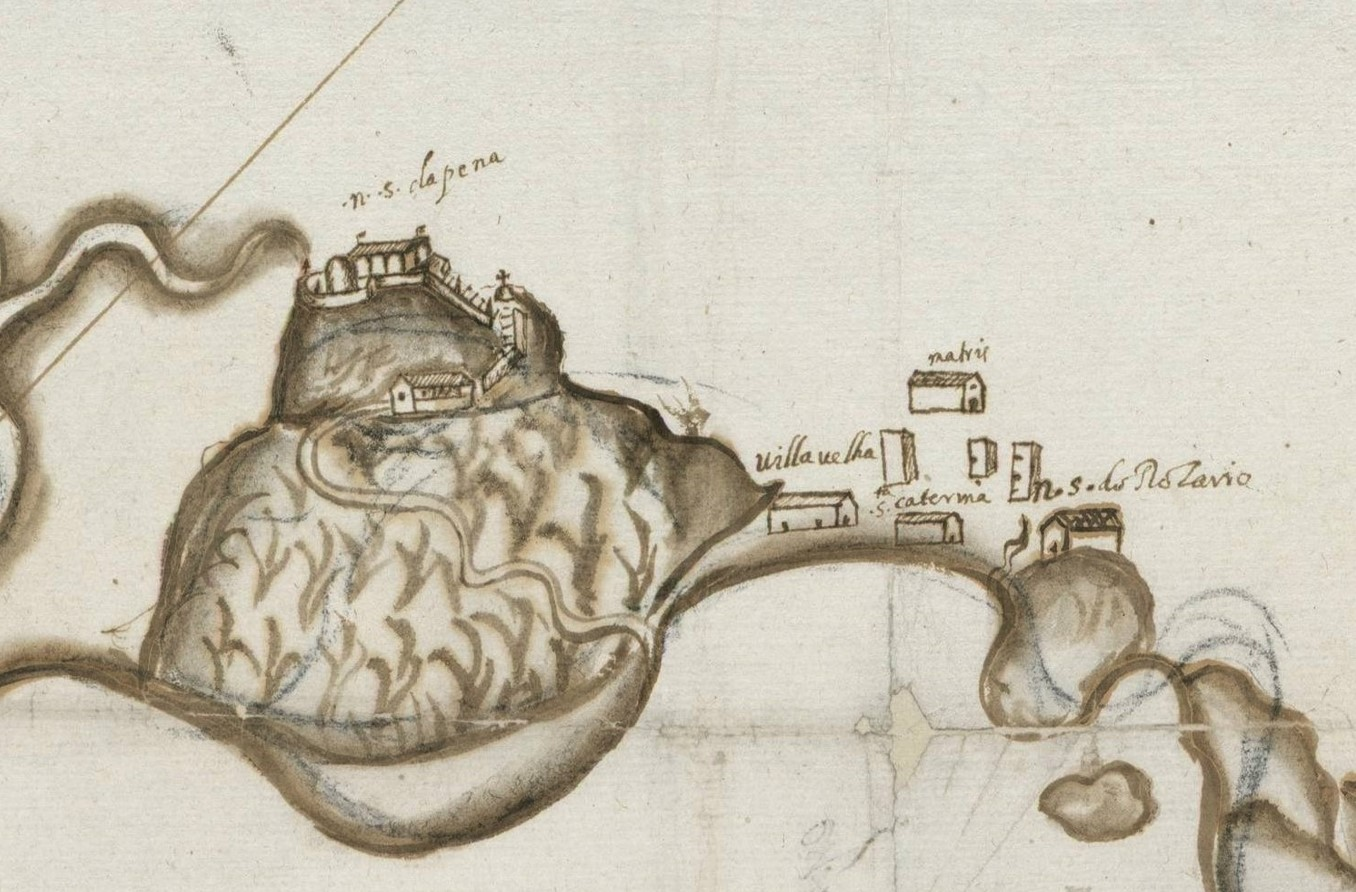
Detail of the map of the Captaincy of Espírito Santo, from around 1612, showing the oldest known floor plan of Vila do Espírito Santo, now Vila Velha.

In 1558, in the vicinity of the Church of the Rosary, Friar Pedro Palácios began the construction of the Penha Convent, which forms, along with the temple, the oldest group of buildings in the historic site. Both structures can be seen on a map from around 1612, which also shows other churches that would have existed in the area of the historic site, but no longer remain: a Mother Church and a Church of Saint Catherine.

All the buildings from the colonial period, with the exception of the Church of the Rosary and the Penha Convent, were demolished at the beginning of the Republican era in a movement led by governors like Jerônimo Monteiro, who sought to modernize Brazilian cities in order to abandon the colonial and monarchist past. The other preserved monuments on the historic site are, overall, buildings erected in the 20th century, but which mark a historical moment in the municipality that was urbanizing and expanding beyond the Prainha area.

== Creation of the Historic Site ==
In 2015, the law that officially created the Prainha Historic Site was passed, with the aim of preserving the site's historical and cultural heritage. The proposal, which had been discussed since the beginning of the century, initially included the construction of an amphitheater designed by architect Oscar Niemeyer and an aquarium that would highlight examples of the region's marine flora and fauna.

== Patrimony ==
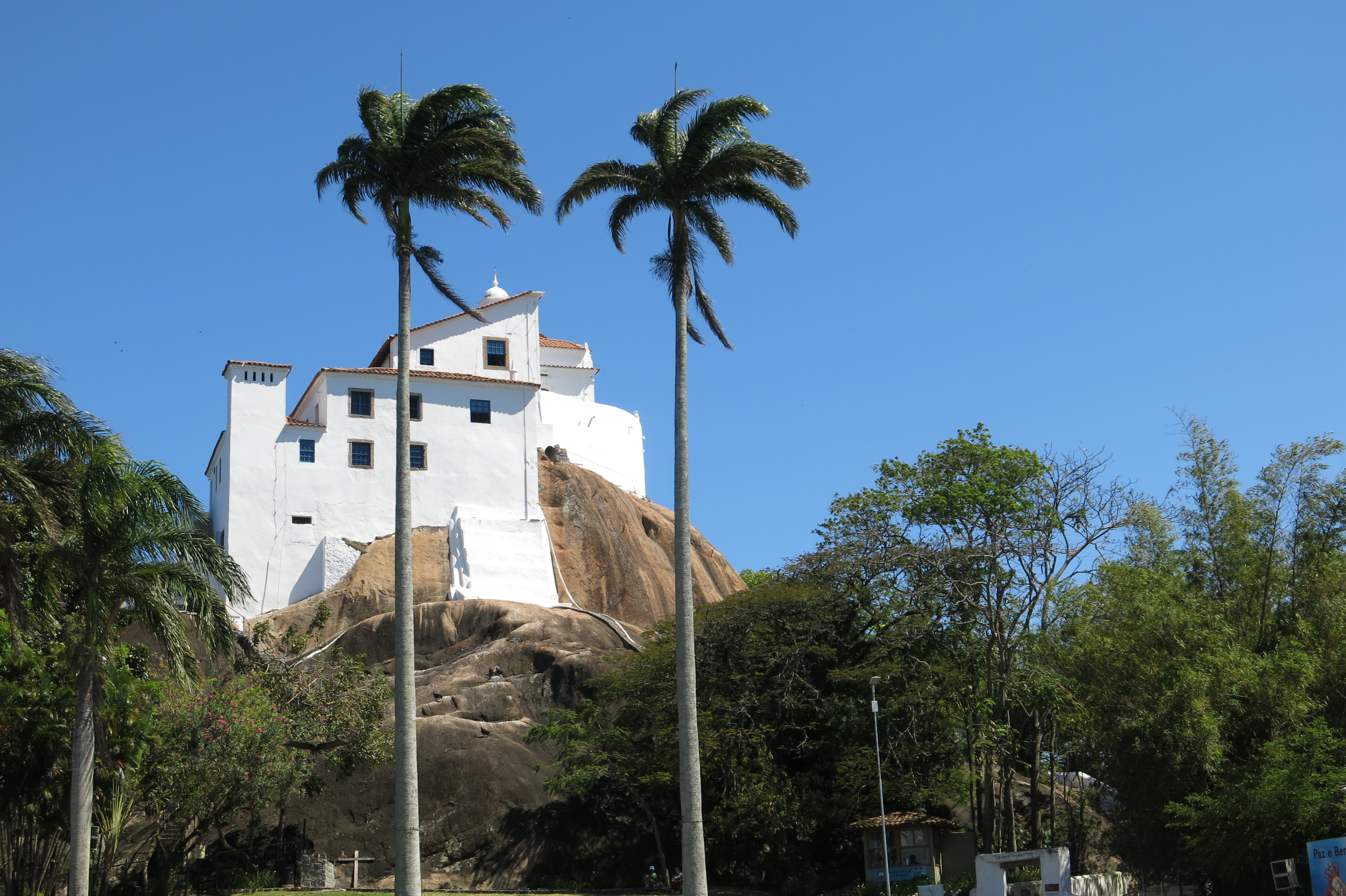
Penha Convent, in Vila Velha.

Among the historical and cultural heritage buildings in the Prainha Historic Site are:

- Penha Convent: considered one of the oldest religious sanctuaries in Brazil, its construction began in 1558 at the request of Friar Pedro Palácios. It sits on top of a hill, 154 meters high;
- Church of Our Lady of the Rosary: it was built at the request of the first donatário, Vasco Fernandes Coutinho, in 1535, making it one of the oldest churches in Brazil and a historical landmark in the colonization of Espírito Santo;
- Casa da Memória Museum: it belongs to the Historic and Geographic Institute of Vila Velha and houses a collection of photographs, flags, navigation instruments and statues, as well as the famous Tram 42, a historical example of the municipality's public transportation from 1930;
- Grotto of Friar Pedro Palácios: a place that would have housed the founder of the Penha Convent in his early years, from where he preached.

== See also ==
- Captaincy of Espírito Santo
- History of Espírito Santo
