= Captaincy of Espírito Santo =

Former territorial division of Brazil (1534-1821)

Royal Captaincy of Espírito Santo Capitania Real do Espírito Santo
- 1534–1821
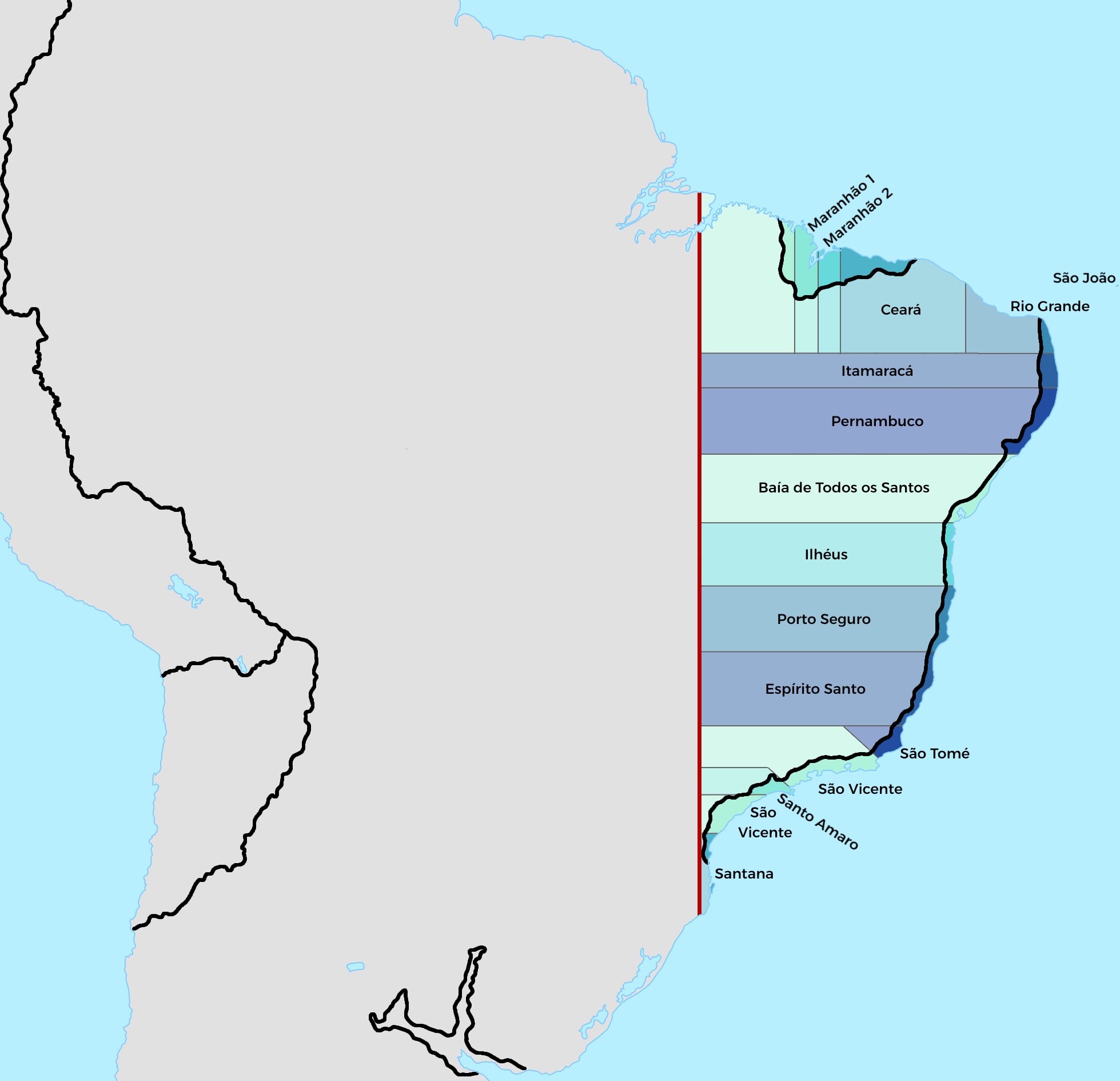
- Map of Brazil in 1534
- Status: Dependent territory
- Capital: Vila do Espírito Santo (1534–1551); Vitória (1551–1821)
- Official languages: Portuguese
- Religion: Catholicism

Government
  - First grantee: Vasco Fernandes Coutinho (1535–1560)

The Captaincy of Espírito Santo (Portuguese: Capitania do Espírito Santo) was one of the administrative units into which the territory of Brazil was divided during the colonial period.

== History ==
There is no consensus regarding the date on which the territory, now known as Espírito Santo, was recognized. The best-known version states that it was identified by Portuguese navigators in 1501, becoming the target of brazilwood smugglers right from the beginning. Another version, defended by Professor Estilaque Ferreira da Silva, points out that the territory may have been approached a few years later due to physical obstacles to navigation from Porto Seguro to the south of the country, which forced ships to go around, rather than bordering the area.

=== Establishment of the captaincy ===
On June 1, 1534, after the establishment of the Hereditary Captaincy system by the Portuguese Empire to colonize Brazil, the territory of Espírito Santo, which comprised the area between the mouth of the Mucuri River and that of the Itapemirim River (approximately), was donated to Vasco Fernandes Coutinho.

He, accompanied by sixty refugees, disembarked from the ship Glória in a small cove on the Penha Hill on May 23, 1535, a Pentecost Sunday, which is the reason why the donatário Coutinho decided to baptize his lot with the name of Captaincy of Espírito Santo.

The landing on Piratininga beach was difficult due to the attacks of the Goitacá, requiring the explosion of two of the ship's artillery pieces to make the natives retreat, which allowed Coutinho to take possession of the land. There, a settlement that would later be known as Vila Velha was built, whose first dwellings were a chapel - under the invocation of Saint John, in honor of the sovereign - and a fortification (the Fortim do Espírito Santo). The indigenous people called this primitive town of Espírito Santo "Mboab", which means bird with feathered feet, "chicks with shoes", in reference to the Portuguese's booted feet. The term, spelled "emboaba", became a pejorative synonym for outsider.

Once the sesmarias had been distributed, Coutinho gave the island next to the bar (today's Ilha do Boi) to Jorge de Menezes; the island of Frades was given to Valentim Nunes; and on July 15, 1537, Duarte de Lemos, the 3rd Lord of Trofa, received the island of Santo Antonio (today's Island of Vitória), where he installed a church in honor of Saint Lucy and his residence.

At this time, the colonizers seemed more comfortable with the natives. However, the lack of settlers to develop the work that had begun forced Coutinho to go to the Metropolis. With his departure for Portugal, the situation was reversed and, in the face of indigenous attacks, a new town was founded on the border island of Santo Antônio in September 1551, and named Nossa Senhora da Vitória; the original town of Espírito Santo would be known as Vila Velha from then on.

=== Fight against foreigners ===
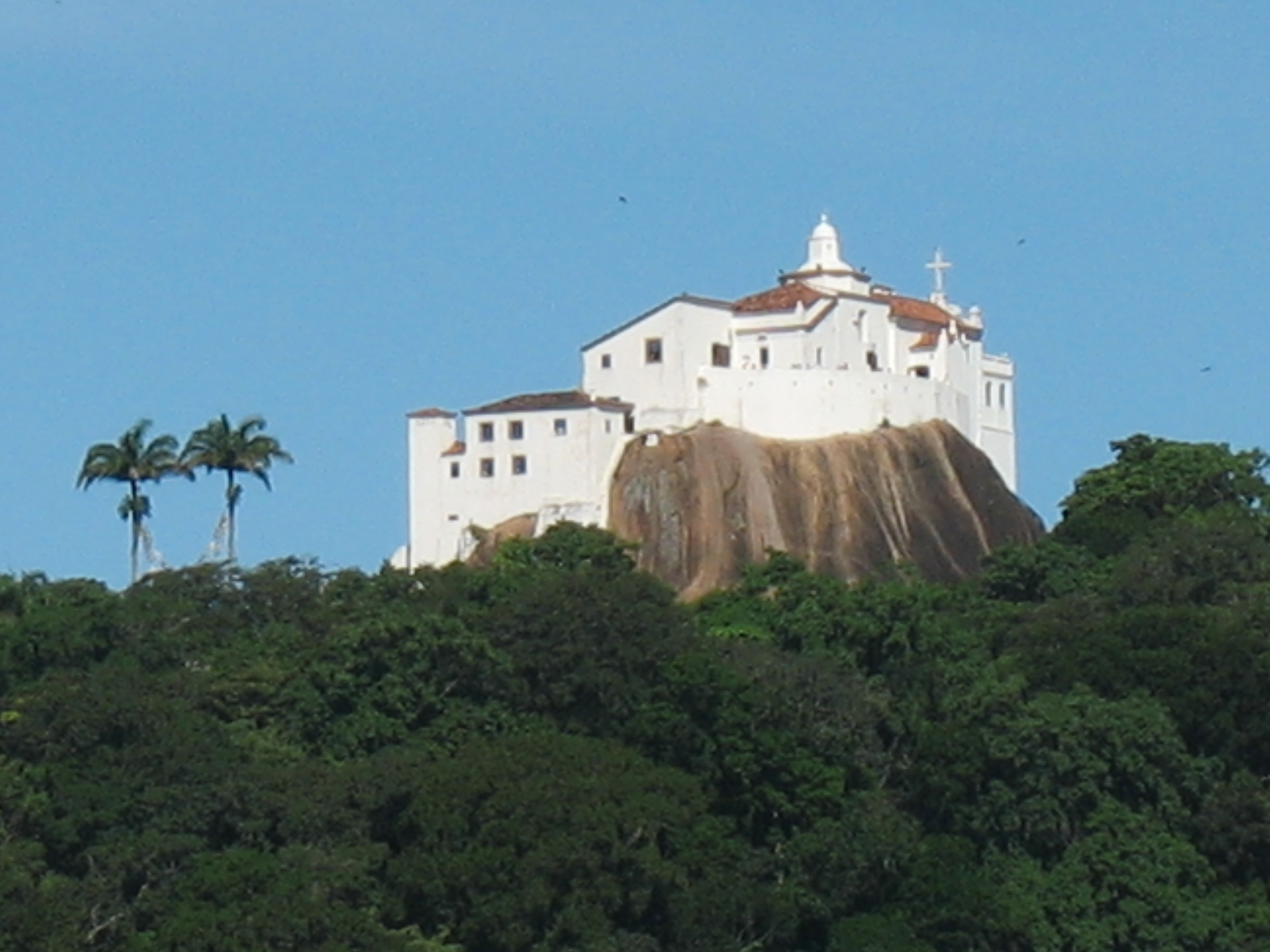
Penha Convent, in Vila Velha, whose construction began around 1558.

Between 1561 and 1564, Belchior Azeredo assumed the role of captain-major with all the powers and jurisdiction previously attributed to Vasco Fernandes Coutinho. Later, Azeredo, in command of one of the ships in Cristóvão de Barros' fleet, participated in the expulsion of the French invaders from Guanabara Bay and was rewarded with the donation of a vast sesmaria, where he settled with his family.

The territory, a target of sporadic invasions by the English and the French, was attacked by the English privateer Thomas Cavendish on February 8, 1592, when he was defeated with the loss of eighty men from his crew, not only because of the invasion, but also due to attacks by indigenous people.

=== Dutch invasions of Brazil ===
During the first Dutch invasions in Brazil, between 1624 and 1625, the donatário of Espírito Santo, Francisco de Aguiar Coutinho, fought off an invasion by eight ships under the command of Piet Hein, from March 10 to 18, 1625, with the support of defensive attacks in the town and by residents.

In the second Dutch invasions, between 1630 and 1654, the territory of the Captaincy of Espírito Santo was attacked again, now with seven ships, under the command of Colonel Johann von Koin. Four hundred men disembarked from the vessels from October 27 to November 13, 1640, but were repelled in Vitória by the forces of Captain João Dias Guedes on October 28. Faced with these attacks, the government-general sent forty troops to Vitória; one last Dutch attack on the Captaincy was recorded in 1653.

=== Administration of Francisco Gil de Araújo ===
In 1674, Francisco Gil de Araújo bought the captaincy from Antônio Luís Gonçalves da Câmara Coutinho for 40,000 cruzados, whose possession was confirmed by Royal Charter on May 18, 1675, and he remained there from 1678 to 1682. During his administration, the construction of the Fort of Nossa Senhora do Carmo was completed, the Fort of São João was rebuilt and the Fort of São Francisco Xavier de Piratininga was erected in the town of Espírito Santo (Vila Velha) to protect the entrance to the bar of Vitória.

=== The mining cycle ===
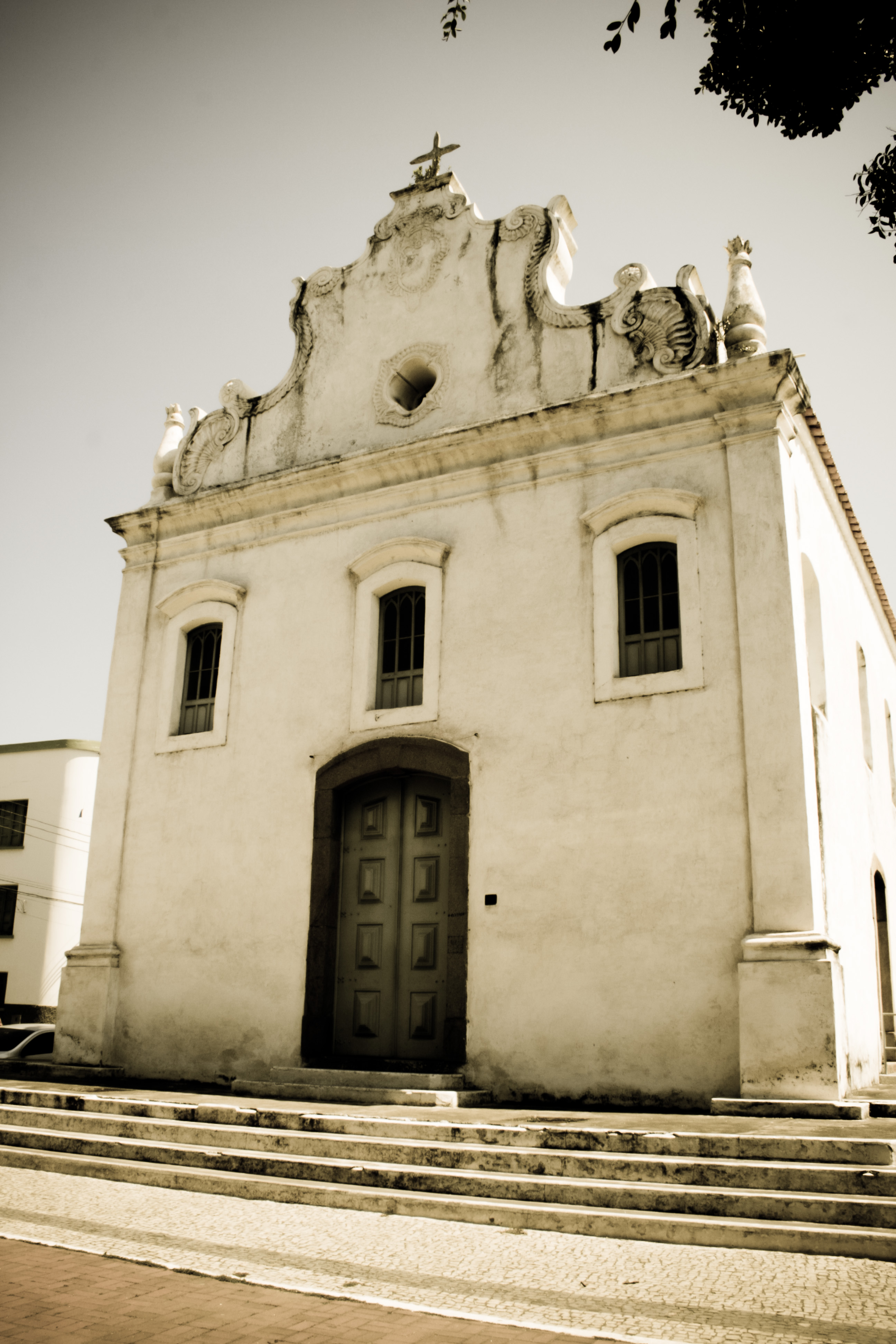
Church of Our Lady of the Rosary, in Vila Velha, which began to be built in 1535 by the donatário Vasco Fernandes Coutinho.

At the beginning of the 18th century, with the discovery of gold mines in the interior of the Captaincy of Espírito Santo, the Portuguese Empire ordered that anyone who found themselves in the gold deposits should gather in the town of Vitória, and that excursions to the region, which was dismembered from the territory and gave rise to Minas Gerais, should be avoided at all costs. For the same safety reasons, the opening of roads linking the Captaincy of Espírito Santo to Minas Gerais was also forbidden.

In 1710, the governor-general observed that Vitória lacked all kinds of infrastructure and blamed this on the poor administration of those who governed the captaincy; however, the reason was the isolation resulting from the discovery of the mines. In 1715, the captaincy returned to the Portuguese Empire by purchase from the descendants of Francisco Gil de Araújo. The deed for this acquisition was drawn up on April 6, 1718.

With the increase in mineral production in Minas Gerais, the importance of the Espírito Santo region grew, and the territory was elevated to the category of comarca by the Provision of the Overseas Council of January 15, 1732.

According to Augusto Sousa, the Royal Provision of April 10, 1736, ordered the governor-general in Bahia to send an engineer to the Captaincy of Espírito Santo every three years, equipped with the necessary materials for all repairs and improvements to the fortifications in the area. Apparently, this only happened in 1767–1768, when José Antônio Caldas was sent there to build the Fortress of Ilha do Boi and renovate the other existing ones. In a report addressed to the governor, he said that the captaincy had around 8,000 people and exported food, wood, cotton cloth and sugar to Bahia, Rio de Janeiro and ports in the south, which were transported on ships belonging to Vitória merchants. This scenario did not change until the beginning of the 19th century, when the captaincy gained autonomy from the Captaincy of Bahia (1809) and began planting coffee around 1815.

After Brazil's independence was proclaimed on September 7, 1822, the territory became a province and remained so until the Proclamation of the Brazilian Republic on November 15, 1889, when it became the current state of Espírito Santo.

== See also ==
- History of Espírito Santo
- List of governors of Espírito Santo
- Prainha Historic Site
- Memory House Museum
