= Fort of São Francisco Xavier de Piratininga =

Military structure in Espirito Santo, Brazil

- Forte de São Francisco Xavier de Piratininga
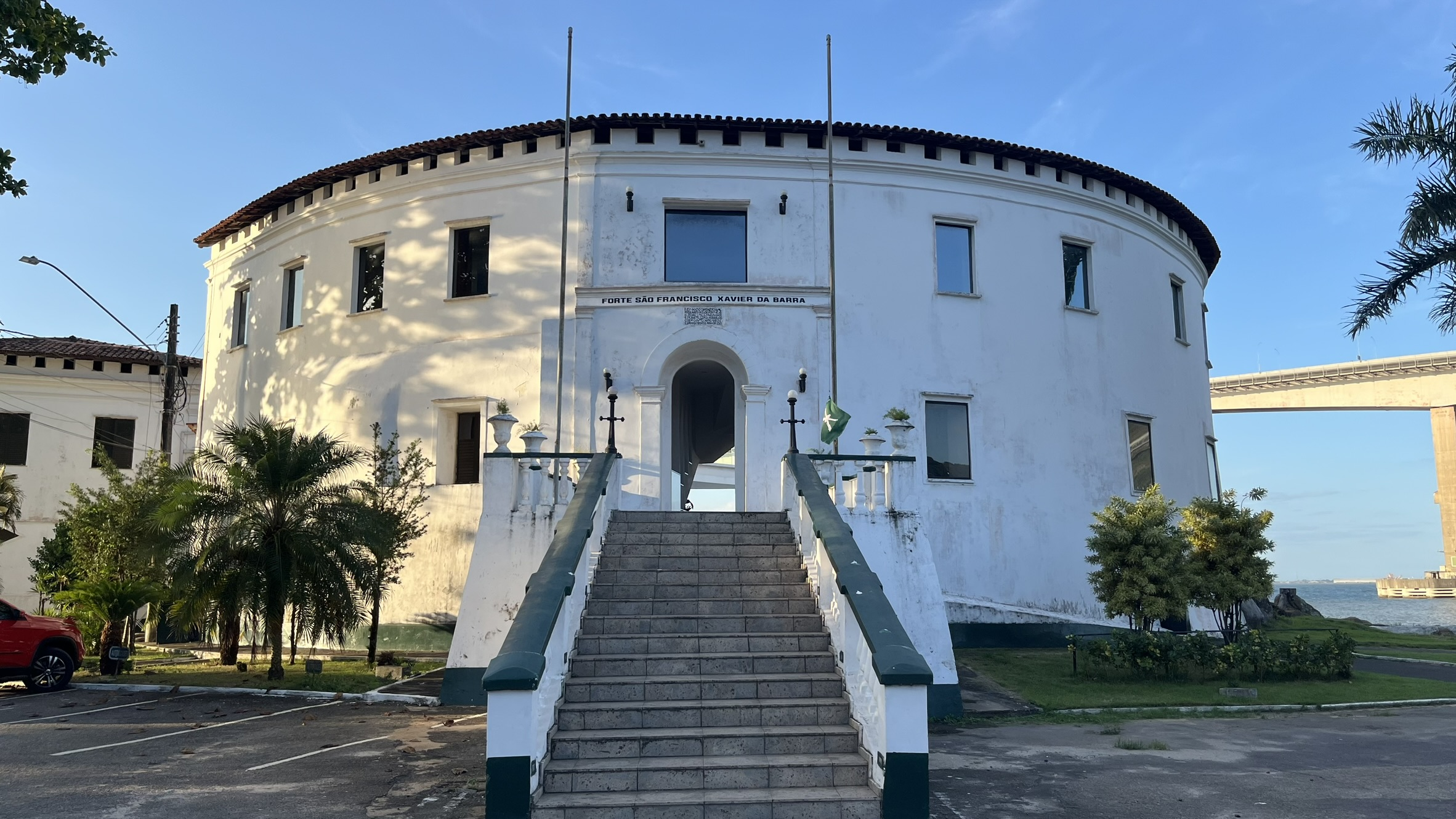
- Interactive map of the Fort of São Francisco Xavier de Piratininga area

General information
- Architectural style: Bastion
- Location: Vila Velha, Espírito Santo, Brazil
- Coordinates: 20°19′25″S 40°17′12″W
- Construction started: 1702; 324 years ago

The Fort of São Francisco Xavier de Piratininga, also known as the Fort of São Francisco Xavier da Barra or simply as the Fort of Piratininga, is located in the Inhoã Cove, in the city of Vila Velha, in the Brazilian state of Espírito Santo. Strategically erected at the base of Penha Hill, its mission was to defend the southern bar of Vitória Bay, on the coast of the former Captaincy of Espírito Santo.

== History ==
=== Background ===
It is believed that the donatário of the Captaincy of Espírito Santo, Vasco Fernandes Coutinho, built a small fortification on the Penha hill for the defense of his people in 1535. However, this fortress didn't last very long.

Around 1674 or 1675, Francisco Gil de Araújo from Bahia bought the Captaincy of Espírito Santo from Antônio Luís Gonçalves da Câmara Coutinho for 40,000 cruzados. In 1702, during his administration, he began work on a fortification equipped with ten pieces of various calibers. Captain-Major Francisco Ribeiro was in charge of the work and in 1703, he left the structure, known as the Fortress of São Francisco Xavier de Piratininga or Fortress of Barra, well advanced. However, in 1705, while it was still under construction, it was attacked by English and Dutch privateers.

The Viceroy and Captain General of Sea and Land of the State of Brazil, Vasco Fernandes César de Meneses, commissioned the engineer Nicolau de Abreu Carvalho to repair the fortifications in the Vitória Bay. The work started in 1726, when it was given a circular layout, armed with fifteen pieces. In 1767, it underwent new renovations. On its level ground stood the Command House, a two-storey building. Access to the fort was via a ramp outside. On June 2, 1862, it was transferred to the Ministry of the Navy to serve as a warehouse.

=== 20th century to the present day ===
By Legislative Decree No. 1,654 of June 13, 1907, the facilities of the old fort were expanded to house the new School of Apprentice Sailors of Espírito Santo, inaugurated on April 1, 1909, and abolished in 1913. On November 10, 1919, it returned to the custody of the Ministry of War, which added a modern barracks that housed the 3rd Battalion of Hunters of the Brazilian Army. Currently, the old fort is part of the 38th Army Infantry Battalion. Visits must be booked in advance with the Social Communication department.

== Features ==
The traces of the fort's existence in the custody of the Brazilian Navy can be found on the balustrade composed of anchors, on a staircase on the inside of the fort and on the navy mast. In a report made by Dionísio Carvalho de Abreu in 1724, the following description is given:

Fort of Barra de São Francisco Xavier: in the shape of a circle, located on the bar of the Vitória Bay, it had nine pieces of artillery, one of which was a sixteen-gauge and the rest an eight-gauge. There were two more pieces dismantled and the wall was badly damaged.

Along with the floor plan of the fortress drawn up in 1801 by Luís dos Santos Vilhena, visitors can read:

Plan and Prospectus of the Fort of S. Francisco Xavier da Barra of the Captaincy of Espirito Santo on the sea in the place called Paratininga, on the South side when entering by the River, on the bright rock, without the seas reaching its wall, separated one league from the village of Vitoria, by its back is the village of Espirito Santo which gave its name to the whole Captaincy. [...] Powerful King of Portugal Peter II ordered this fortress to be built by Rodrigo da Costa, Governor and Captain General of this State of Brazil [...].

== See also ==
- History of Espírito Santo
