= Chapel of Saint Lucy (Vitória) =

Catholic temple in Espírito Santo, Brazil

- Capela de Santa Luzia
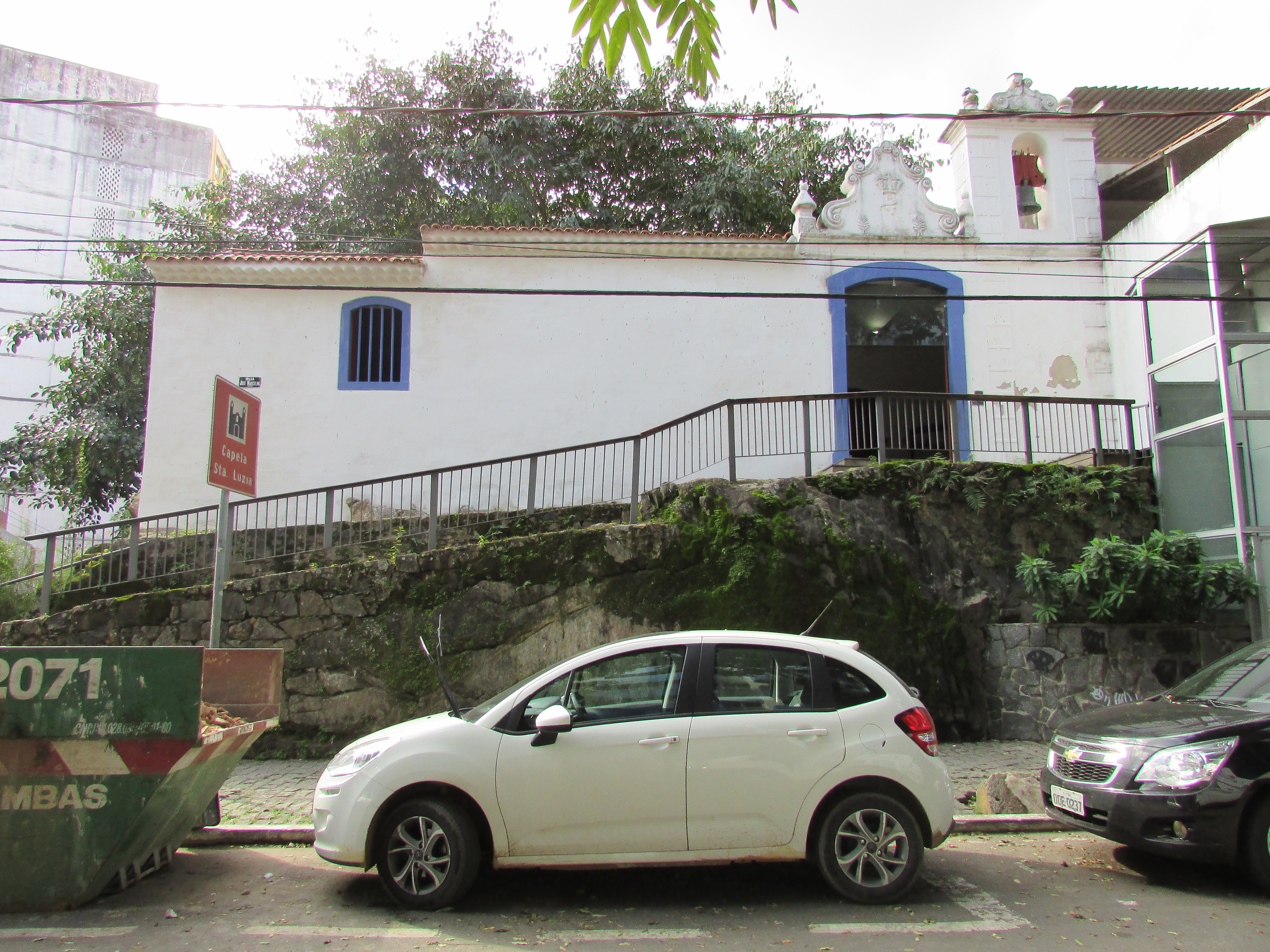
- Chapel of Saint Lucy
- 20°19′10.643″S 40°20′18.19″W
- Location: Vitória, Espírito Santo; Brazil

History
- Founded: 1537

The Chapel of Saint Lucy is a Catholic temple located in the historic center of the city of Vitória, the capital of Espírito Santo and built in 1537.

== History ==
Considered the oldest building in Vitória, the Chapel of Saint Lucy was erected in the 16th century as a private temple on the farm of Duarte de Lemos, the first resident of the island of Santo Antônio - now the city of Vitória - who received the plot of land as a sesmaria donated by the first donatário of the captaincy of Espírito Santo, Vasco Fernandes Coutinho.

The chapel's simple architectural features are common characteristics of the state's baroque churches, which proves possible alterations to its traits, since it was built before the Baroque period, prominent in the 18th and 19th centuries.

The small church was "built on a rock, with mortared stone masonry foundations directly supported and visible on the side and front facades". It is the only monument in the upper town that preserves the characteristics of Brazilian colonial architecture.

The chapel underwent some renovations over time; the first was probably in 1812, when it acquired its current baroque features in order to serve as a religious temple until 1928, when it was vacated.

== Protection and renovation ==
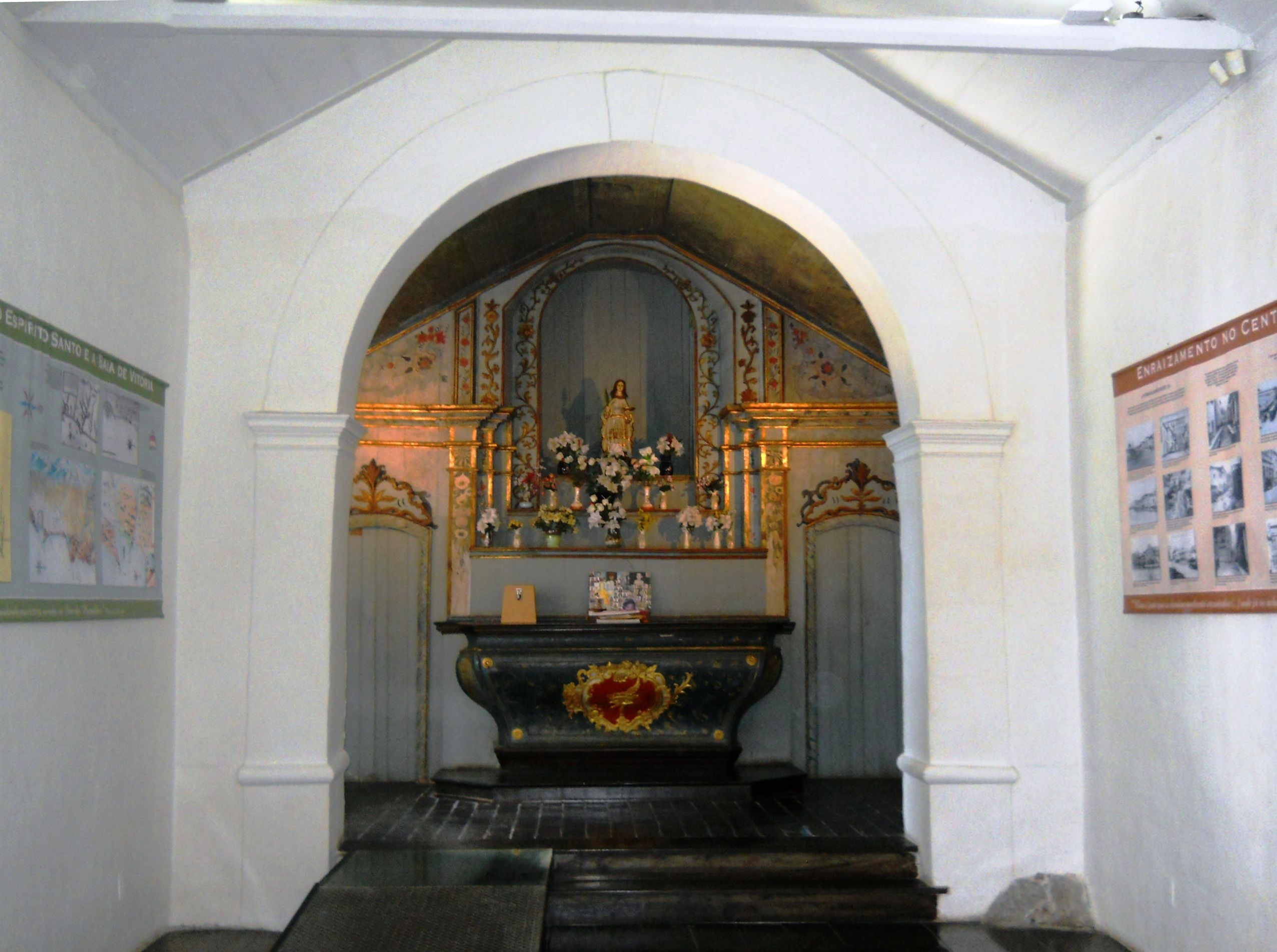
Interior and altar of the chapel.

The Chapel of Saint Lucy was listed as a historic monument by the National Institute of Historic and Artistic Heritage (IPHAN) in 1946. After being registered, it underwent a series of restorations and renovations:

- 1947: reform to prevent a collapse;
- 1970: the roof, ceiling and floors were restored;
- 1994 - 1996: simple renovation;
- 1998: restoration of the high altar and pulpit;
- 2005: discovery of paintings on the wooden ceiling and walls of the main chapel, probably executed in the 19th century;
- 2012: restoration of the facade;
- 2016: restoration work, with reopening in 2019.

From 1950 to 1970, it housed the Museum of Sacred Art of Espírito Santo, which was then transferred to the Solar Monjardim Museum. Between 1976 and 1994 it was used as the Art and Research Gallery of the Federal University of Espírito Santo. Years later, when IPHAN took over management of the chapel again, the sacred art collection returned to the building until the creation of the Brazilian Institute of Museums (Ibram).

Nowadays, it is an essential tourist attraction for those looking to visit the historic center of Vitória.

== See also ==
- History of Espírito Santo
- Captaincy of Espírito Santo
