= Gaas =

Gaas or GAAS may refer to:

== People ==
- Abdiweli Gaas, Somali politician
- Hans Gaas
- Mohamouda Ahmed Gaas, Ethiopian politician

== Places ==
- Gaas, Landes, Nouvelle-Aquitaine, France

== Other ==
- Gaelic Athletic Association
- Galeria de Artes Álvaro Santos, Brazilian art gallery founded in 1966
- Gallium arsenide (GaAs), semiconductor
- Games as a service, revenue model for video games
- Generally Accepted Auditing Standards
