= Solar Monjardim Museum =

Brazilian historical public museum in Vitória, Espírito Santo

Coordinates: 20.3058°S 40.3219°W

- Museu Solar Monjardim
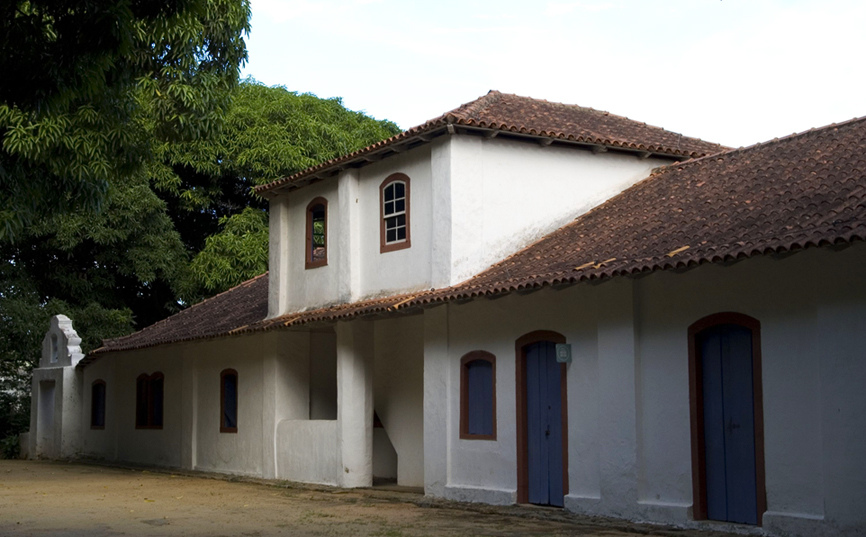
- Former name: Capixaba Museum
- Established: 1939
- Location: Solar Monjardim, Santa Cecília, Vitória, Espírito Santo, Brazil
- Type: Historical museum
- Director: Evaldo Pereira Portela
- Location of Solar Monjardim Museum

The Solar Monjardim Museum (MSM) is a Brazilian historical public museum located in the Solar Monjardim, in Santa Cecília, neighborhood of Vitória, Espírito Santo. The museum is currently one of the federal institutions administered by the Brazilian Institute of Museums (Ibram).

== Facilities and collection ==
The 18th-century manor house is considered to be the oldest private rural building from Espírito Santo's colonial period, having been the seat of the Jucutuquara farm. The manor house has eleven bedrooms, three halls, a chapel dedicated to Our Lady of Mount Carmel, a kitchen with tiled floors and a long veranda. The adjoining buildings were home industry establishments and house slaves. The museum's collection contains around 4,000 items, including furniture, sacred art and household utensils, and is designed to reconstitute the rural residence of a wealthy family in the 19th century.

== History ==
The Jucutuquara farm was owned by priests from the Society of Jesus. When the Jesuits were expelled, the farm was acquired by the merchant Gonçalo Pereira Pinto. His land stretched from the hill of Capixaba to Ponta de Tubarão, producing cassava flour and later coffee.

At the beginning of the 19th century, it was owned by Captain Major Francisco Pinto Homem de Azevedo, who rebuilt the house. His daughter and heiress, Ana Francisca de Paula, born in 1797, married Colonel José Francisco de Andrade e Almeida Monjardim, whose son, Alfeu Adolfo Monjardim de Andrade e Almeida, would be awarded the title of Baron of Monjardim and elected president of the province of Espírito Santo in 1891. The Monjardim family kept the property for 150 years until 1940, when the building was listed as a national heritage site.

=== Capixaba Museum: 1939–1964 ===
On October 25, 1940 the residence was listed as a historical heritage site by the National Historic and Artistic Heritage Service (currently the National Institute of Historic and Artistic Heritage – IPHAN) and in 1942, the complex was rented to the government of Espírito Santo. In 1952, the manor house became home to the collection of the former Capixaba Museum, which had been operating since 1939 and was until then based in the former Military Police Barracks, in what is now Praça Misael Pena, downtown. The collection of the Capixaba Museum came from the collections of the Historical and Geographical Institute of Espírito Santo and also from the collection of Olinto Aguirre.

=== UFES Museum of Art and History: 1966–1969 ===
The Capixaba Museum operated until 1964, when the process of transferring the museum to the Federal University of Espírito Santo (UFES) began, and was completed in 1966. That same year, the building received the collection of the Museum of Sacred Art of Espírito Santo (which had been housed in the Chapel of Saint Lucy since 1945) and became known as the Museum of Art and History of UFES, which operated until 1969.

=== Solar Monjardim Museum: since 1980 ===
==== UFES: 1980–2001 ====
In 1978 the building was definitively expropriated in favor of UFES. In 1980, after restoration work, the museum was refurbished and renamed by the then National Pro-Memory Foundation and reopened under the name Solar Monjardim Museum. In 1981 the property was donated by UFES to IPHAN.

==== Iphan: 2001–2009 and Ibram: since 2009 ====
In October 2001 the administration passed from UFES to the Iphan Museums Department (Demu), which in 2006 carried out restoration work on the manor house, as well as landscaping and the construction of an amphitheater. Since 2009, it has been administered by Ibram, a new autarchy that emerged from the spin-off of the former Demu, and is the only federal museum in Vitória linked to the Ministry of Culture.

== See also ==
- History of Espírito Santo

== Bibliography ==
- Museu Solar Monjardim (in Brazilian Portuguese). Vitória, Espírito Santo: Secretaria de Difusão e Produção Cultural da Universidade Federal do Espírito Santo – Ufes/Iphan. 1997. p. 68.
