= Memory House Museum =

Museum in Vila Velha, Brazil

- Museu Casa da Memória
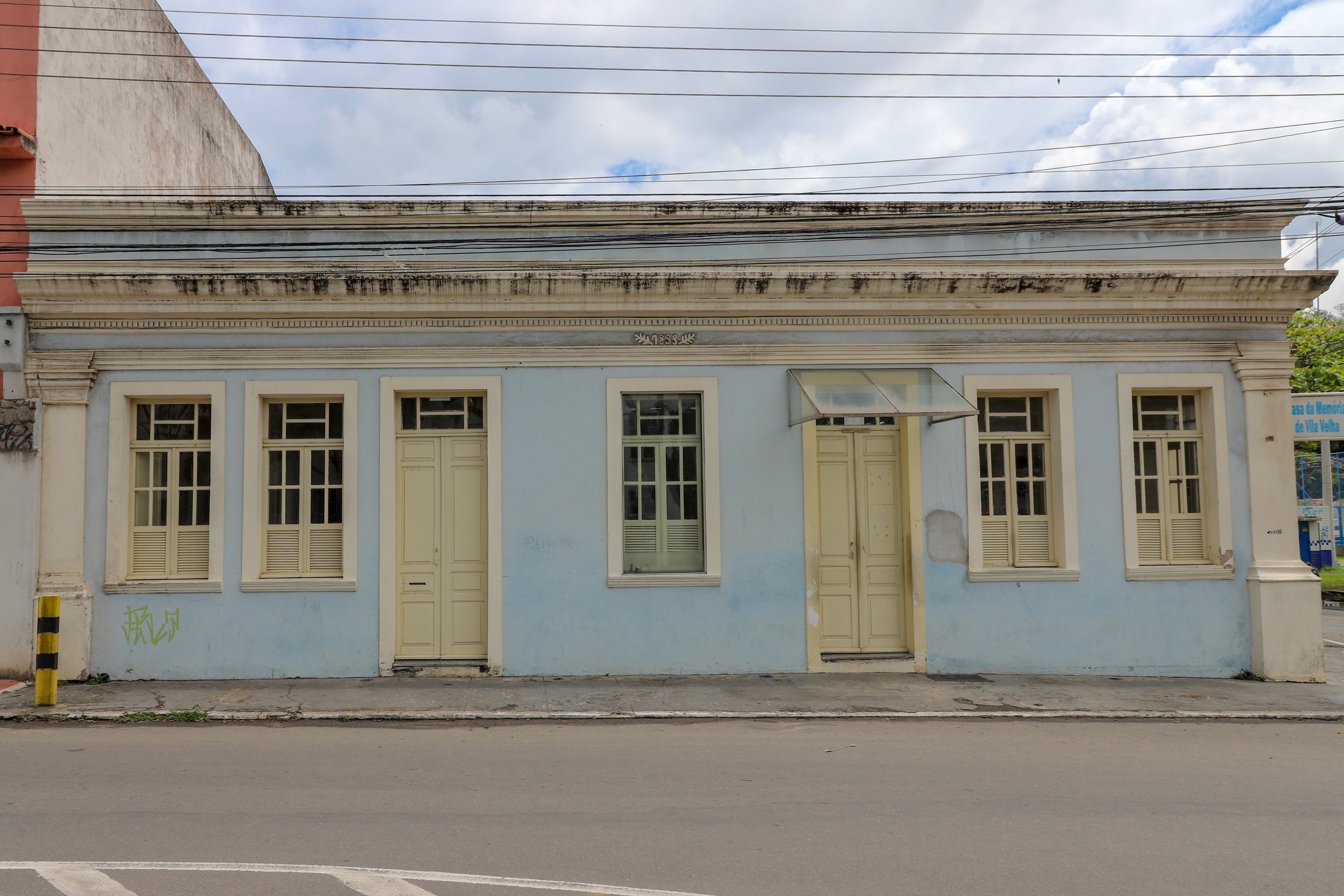
- Memory House Museum

- Location within Brazil
- Established: 1997
- Location: Vila Velha, Espírito Santo, Brazil
- Coordinates: 20.329431°S 40.292211°W
- Type: Museum

The Memory House Museum (Portuguese: Museu Casa da Memória) is a Brazilian museum in Vila Velha, created in 1997. It is located in a house built in 1893, which was restored by the DEC/ES through the efforts of a group of volunteers and Vila Velha residents. The project began in 1993 and was inaugurated as the Memory House Museum in 1994. This late nineteenth-century building was the result of a movement organized by the Prainha Residents' Association.

The entire collection on display at the Memory House belongs to the Historical and Geographical Institute of Vila Velha (IHGVV). The collection includes old photographs, flags, navigational instruments, statues of important historical figures, newspapers, magazines and other documents about Prainha and Vila Velha's historical site. There are also statues of the first Donatário of the Captaincy of Espírito Santo, Vasco Fernandes Coutinho, and the first female Donat in Brazil, Captain Luiza Grinalda. There is also a sixteenth-century cannon, as well as the 1930 Bonde 42, the public transport active in the city until 1973, which was restored by the IHGVV to be included in the exhibition.

== Permanent exhibition ==
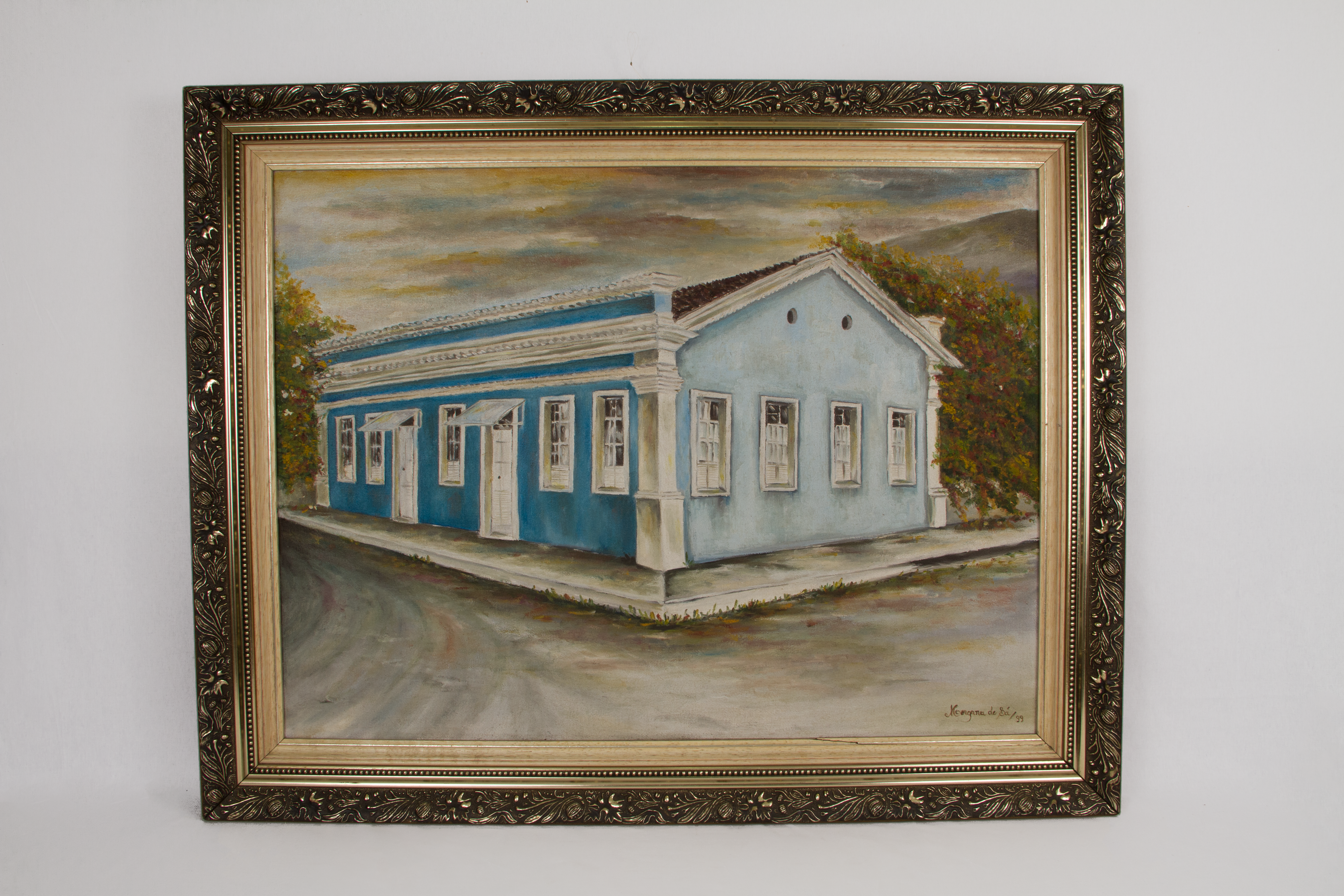
Painting of the Memory House, Historical and Geographical Institute of Vila Velha.

The permanent exhibition was a project by the President of the Vila Velha Historical and Geographical Institute, Luiz Paulo Rangel, in 2008. It is based on the early history of the state of Espírito Santo, from its beginnings in 1535, with the arrival of its first Donatário, Vasco Fernandes Coutinho, until it became a state of republic. Each year, it has been improved and adjusted for a more appropriate presentation to visitors. Divided into rooms, the exhibition contains several historical facts about Espírito Santo, such as the family tree of Vasco Fernandes Coutinho, the first grantee of the Espírito Santo captaincy, as well as the letter from the King of Portugal donating the piece of land (Captaincy). Some objects that tell the story of the navigation and the beginning of colonization and the battles against the indigenous people are also on display in the museum.

In addition, the museum exhibits an original cannon from the time it was used at the Carmo Fort in Vitória.

== Opening hours ==
The Memory House is open from Tuesday to Friday from 9 am to 5 pm and on Saturdays, Sundays and public holidays from 10 am to 4 pm. Visitors have free access to the museum.
