= Penha Convent =

Coordinates: 20.3293°S 40.2871°W

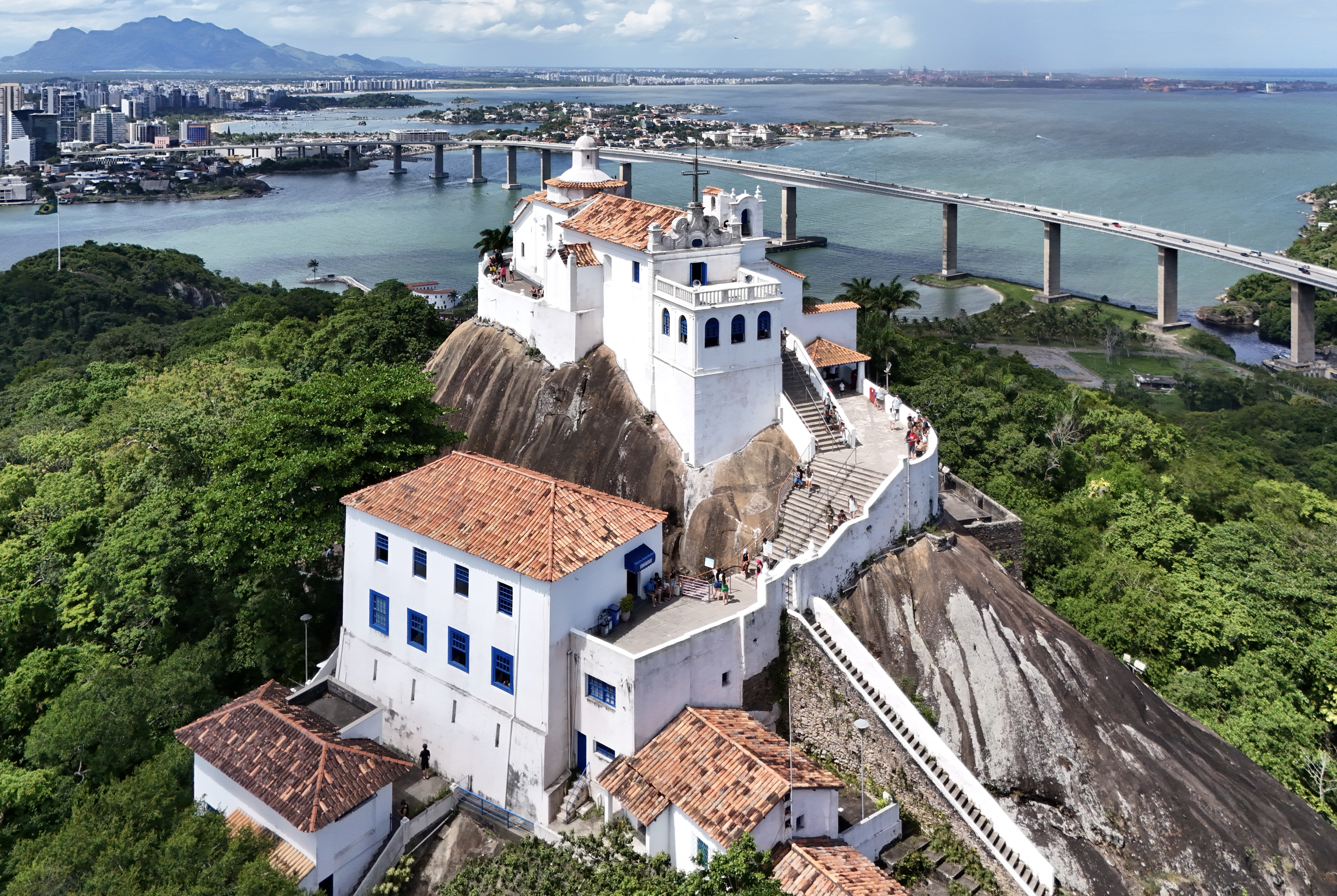
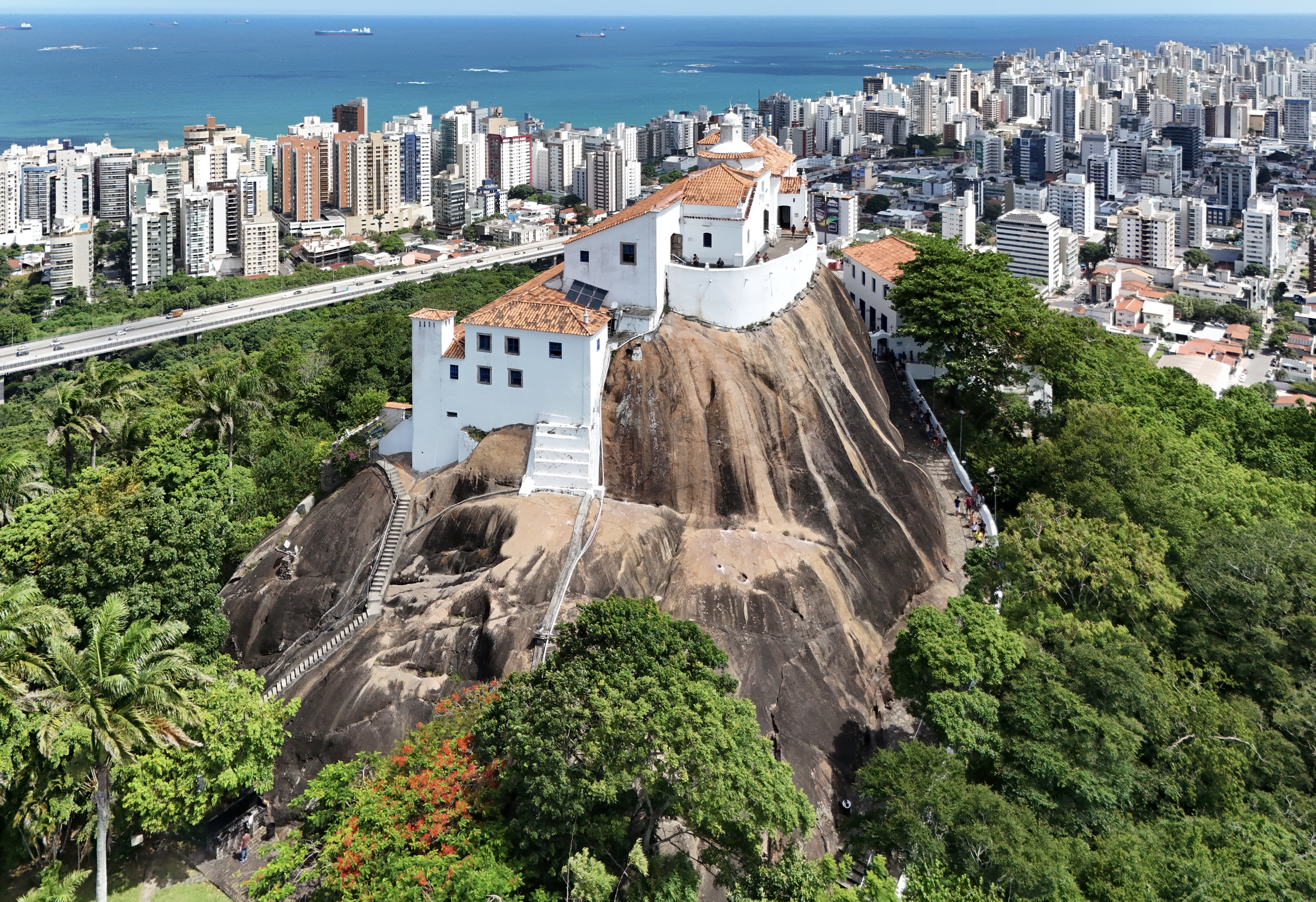
Penha Convent in 2025

Penha Convent (Portuguese: Convento da Penha) is a convent in Vila Velha, Brazil, on the top of a high mountain overlooking the cities of Vitória and Vila Velha. Founded in approximately 1558 by Pedro Palácios, today it is home to Espírito Santo's Patron Saint, Our Mother of Penha. Many believers make pilgrimages to this site which is surrounded by a green haven of forest. Due to its location between two large urban areas, it is also a very much sought-after leisure spot on weekends and holidays. It is considered one of the main tourist attractions of the Brazilian Southeast state of Espírito Santo.

Every year, there is an important celebration to the Saint, called Festa da Penha, where believers dedicate their miles praying and thanking the Saint. Some have traveled from all over Brazil in order to get there.

The men usually start their walk from the Capital Vitoria and finish at the Convent in Vila Velha. The women also pay their respects and walk from the closest Church (Santuario) up to the Convent. Inside the Convent there are millions of thank you notes from people that claim to have been cured by Nossa Senhora da Penha. They have left many of their notes along with their old handicapped chairs and much more. The view from the Convent is one of the most beautiful views. Being able to see the Island of Vitoria and the City of Vila Velha and one of the most beautiful beaches along the coast of Brazil called Praia da Costa. Where at the end of the beach, you can also see the house of the Governor.

== Annual state meeting of the Terço dos Homens movement ==
Every year, in May, the Terço dos Homens movement gathers at the Convent. Thousands of men pray the Rosary and attend Mass.

== See also ==
- Church of Our Lady of the Rosary
- Chapel of Saint Lucy
- Prainha Historic Site
