= Seara =

Coordinates: 27°07′S 52°17′W

- Municipality
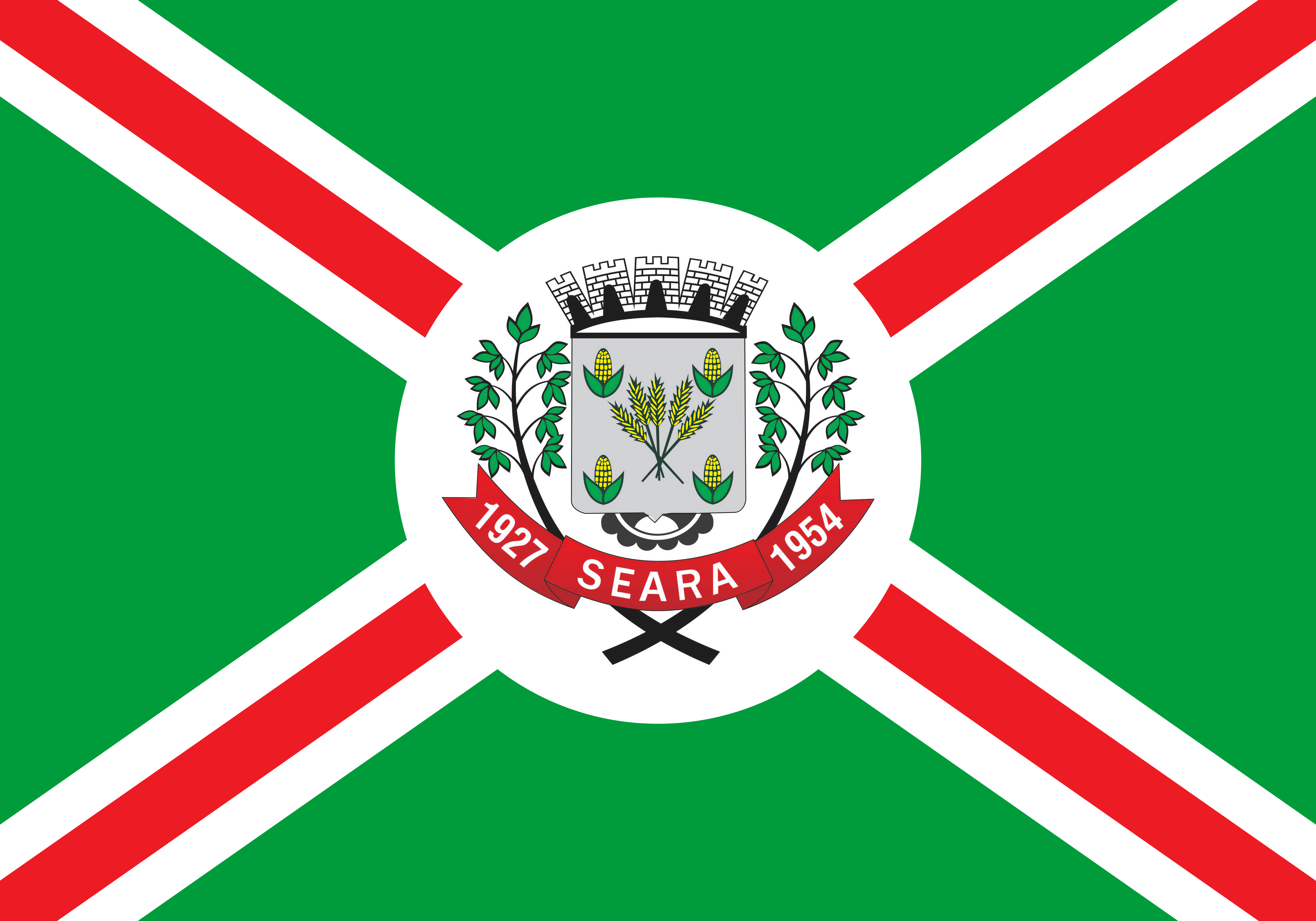
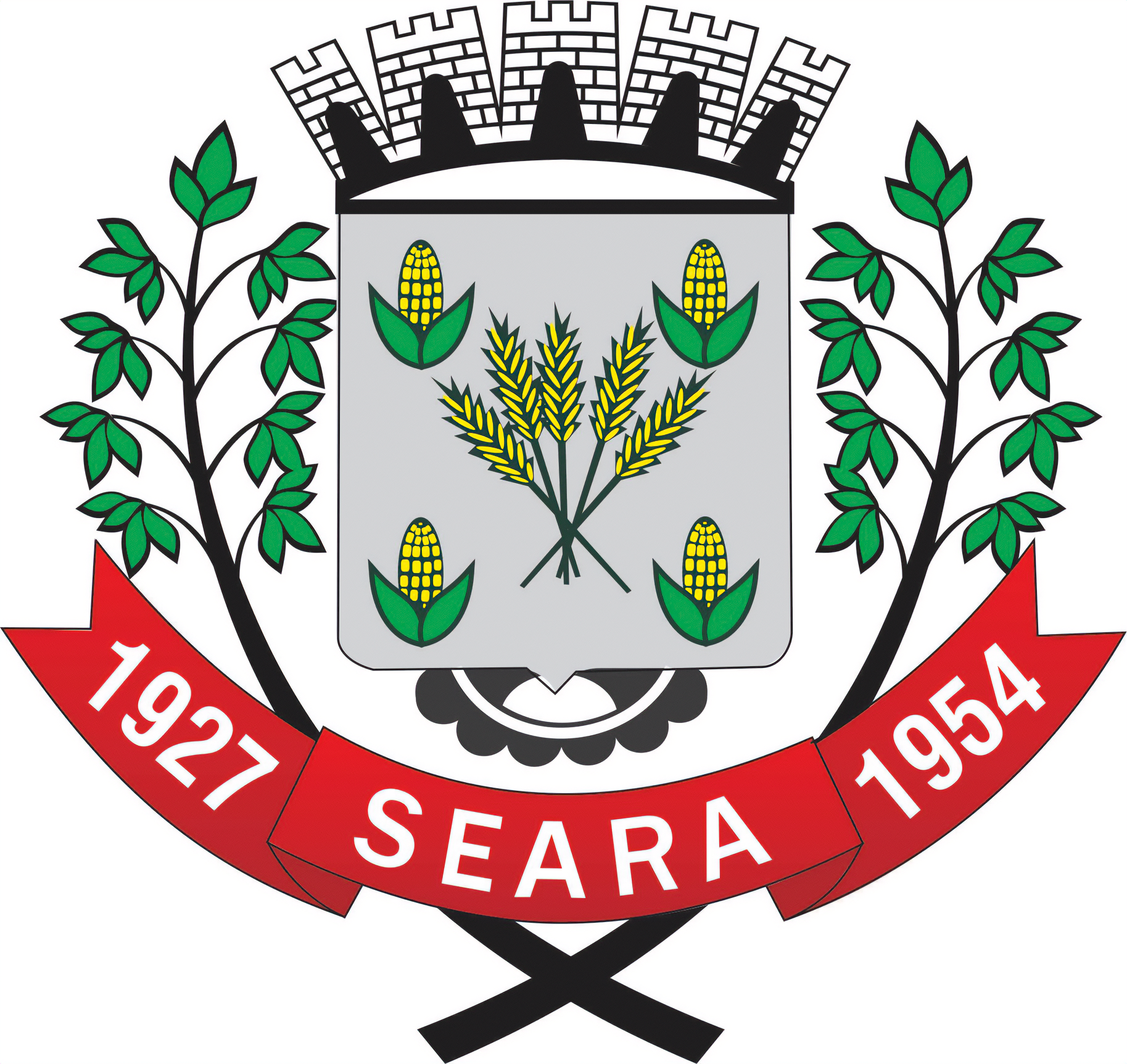
- Flag Coat of arms
- Interactive map of Seara
- Country: Brazil
- Region: South
- State: Santa Catarina
- Mesoregion: Oeste Catarinense

Population (2020)
  - Total: 17,576
- Time zone: UTC -3
- Website: www.seara.sc.gov.br

Seara is a municipality in the state of Santa Catarina in the South region of Brazil. The Museu Entomológico Fritz Plaumann is located in the town.

== Notable people ==
Aline Weber, 1989, Fashion model

== See also ==
- List of municipalities in Santa Catarina
