= Donataria =

Land administered by a donatário

The Donataria system was the basic seigneurial administrative system employed in Portuguese and Spanish Empires, governed by a donatary (donatário).

Unable to directly exercise the right of lordship over his lands or islands, the donatary was a means by which the king delegated his powers, with certain restrictions, in full confidence of his people. The grantee was responsible for the administration of their territory on behalf of the sovereign and the land considered the legal instrument that established this guarantee. The grantee had certain benefits, rights and obligations therein defined, with limited action in several fields, namely justice.

== See also ==
- Portuguese Empire
- Portuguese colonization
