= Maria Ortiz (1603–1646) =

Brazilian heroine

Maria Ortiz (1603 – 1646) was a Portuguese woman from Colonial Brazil, famous for her defense of Espírito Santo against the attempted Dutch invasion in 1624.
