= Museu Entomológico Fritz Plaumann =

The Museu Entomológico Fritz Plaumann (English: The Fritz Plaumann Entomological Museum) is an entomological museum located in Seara (formerly Nova Teutônia), Santa Catarina, Brazil. The museum contains the collections of famed entomologist Fritz Plaumann and is kept by an agreement between the municipal government of Seara, where the entomologist lived, and the Santa Catarina State University (UFSC). It is a relatively small collection, with about 80,000 individuals from 17,000 species, most of them collected by Plaumann himself around the Upper Uruguai river region. The biggest entomological collections in Brazil are the ones from Museu Nacional do Rio de Janeiro (MNRJ, approx. 7,000,000 specimens), Museu de Zoologia de São Paulo (MZSP, approx. 4,700,000 specimens) and Universidade Federal do Paraná (DZUP, approx. 3,000,000 specimens).
