= Museu Rodin Bahia =

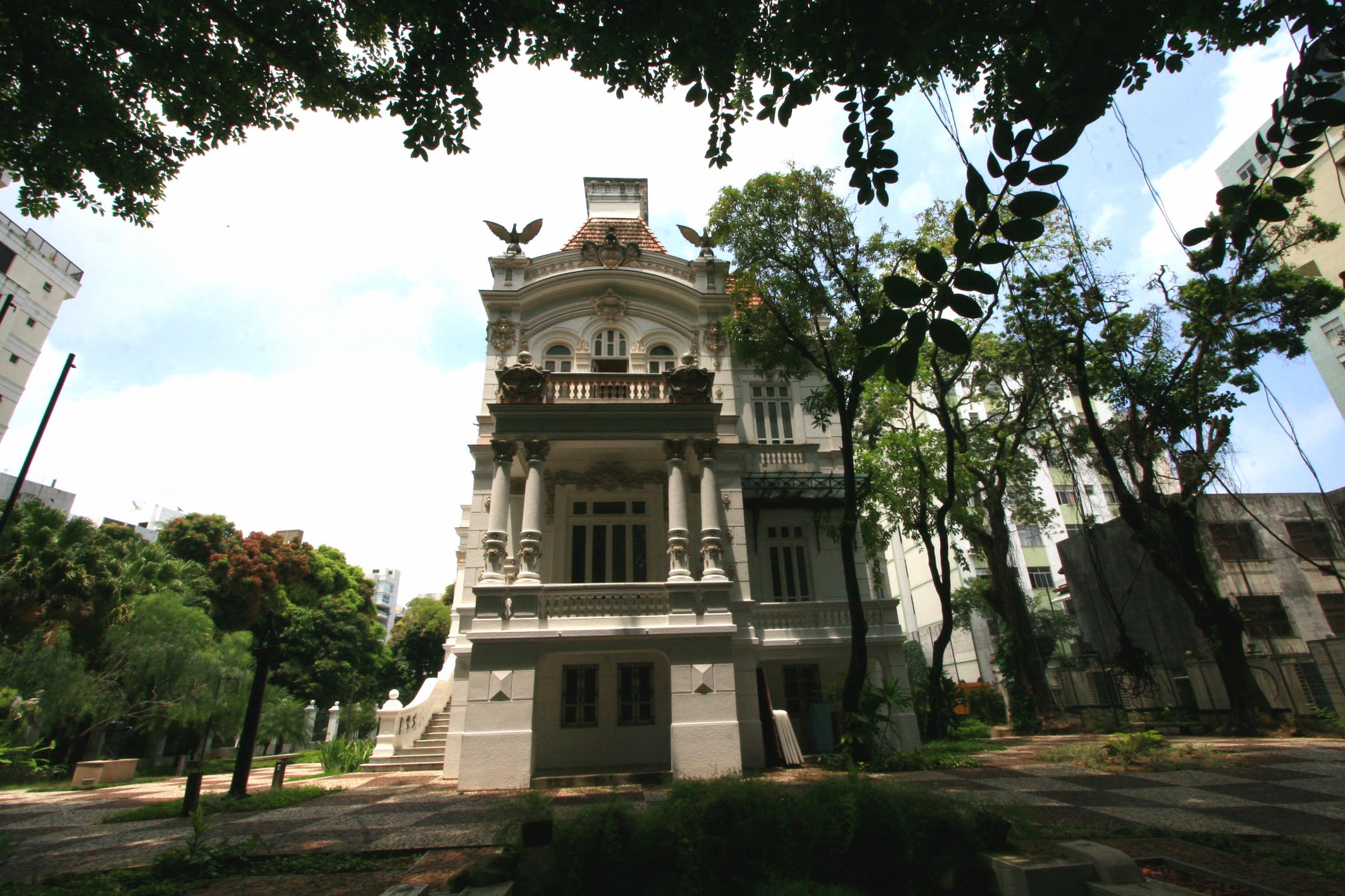
- The museum in 2009
- Established: 2007; 19 years ago
- Dissolved: 2023
- Location: Rua da Graça, 284; Graça, Salvador, Brazil
- Coordinates: 12.99794°S 38.52559°W

The Museu Rodin Bahia was a museum devoted to the works of Auguste Rodin, in Salvador, Bahia, Brazil. In 2023, the museum was replaced by the Museum of Contemporary Art of Bahia.

== See also ==
- List of single-artist museums
