= Museu de Arte de Ribeirão Preto =

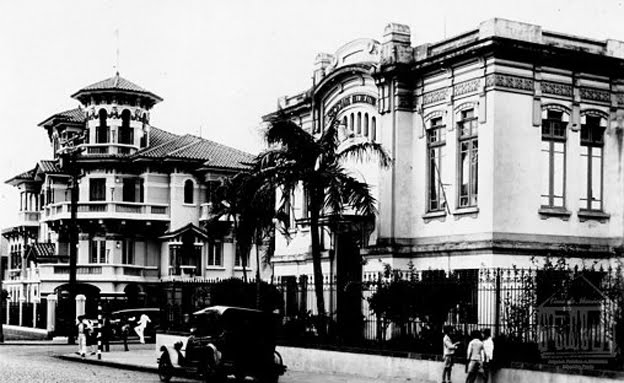
Recreational Building Society (in foreground), current headquarters of the museum in 1930.

The Museu de Arte de Ribeirão Preto "Pedro Manuel-Gismondi" (Art Museum of Ribeirão Preto or Museum Pedro Manuel Gismondi, short MARP) is an art museum in the city of Ribeirão Preto in the state of São Paulo, Brazil. Opened in 1992, with the aim of bringing together the art collection belonging to the city, the museum is a local public institution, subordinated to the Municipal Secretary of Culture. Since its founding, the museum is housed in the former Recreation Society building, opened in 1908, who has also served as headquarters to the City of Ribeirão Preto.

In less than two decades of existence, the museum has hosted major exhibitions and competitions and has developed projects of national scope, highlighting the Art Salon of Ribeirão Preto (SARP). The museum has an art collection focusing on regional production, but also including important names in modern and contemporary art in Brazil.

It is equipped with a specialized library and maintains extensive educational activities and cultural. The museum also runs one second exhibition space, convention center located in Ribeirão Preto, and develops its activities in close collaboration with other cultural institutions of the city.
