= Galeria de Artes Álvaro Santos =

Art Gallery Álvaro Santos
- Funcaju
- Interactive map of the Art Gallery Álvaro Santos area

General information
- Status: Art Gallery
- Architectural style: Neoclassical
- Location: Praça Olímpio Campos, s/n, Aracaju, Brazil
- Coordinates: 10.913671°S 37.050576°W
- Current tenants: Ministry of Culture (Art Gallery)
- Owner: Brazilian government
- Landlord: João Luiz Silva Ferreira

National Historic Heritage of Brazil

The Art Gallery Álvaro Santos (GAAS, in Portuguese: Galeria de Arte Álvaro Santos) is a Brazilian public contemporary art gallery founded in 1966, based in the square Olímpio Campos s/n, Centro in Aracaju, Sergipe.

== History ==
The Gallery of Art Alvaro Santos was founded on September 26, 1966. At the site, previously, there was an old aquarium. The inaugural exhibition took place with 50 oils on canvas of Álvaro Santos, and the symbolic ribbon was cut by his niece, Marlene Alvarez Santos.

The gallery is an important showcase of art and culture in the city of Aracaju, with exhibitions of local artists, national and international. The gallery receives book launches, exhibitions of paintings and sculptures, as well as discussions and evening parties.

== See also ==
- List of museums in Brazil
