= History of Espírito Santo =

Brazilian state

Flag of the State of Espírito Santo

The History of Espírito Santo is composed of studies focused on the evolution of the territory and society of the state of Espírito Santo, Brazil, from the first indigenous inhabitants and the creation of the Captaincy of Espírito Santo by Vasco Fernandes Coutinho, in 1535, to the present day.

Also in 1535, the settlement of Vila Velha was founded, the first population center of the captaincy. In the task of catechizing the region's Indians, the figure of Joseph of Anchieta stood out.

There was a long period in the meantime, unknown to many, when Espírito Santo was annexed to Bahia, with its capital based in Salvador.

The prohibition of mining in Minas Gerais and the presence of hostile tribes in the countryside contributed to Espírito Santo remaining for a long time an essentially coastal captaincy. The situation changed only in the second half of the 19th century, due to the expansion of coffee farming. The occupation of the extreme north occurred at the beginning of the 20th century, due to the first cacao plantations, established by farmers from Bahia. But it was only in 1963 that Espírito Santo acquired its current geographical configuration, with the solution of the old dispute between the state and Minas Gerais, regarding the ownership of the Serra dos Aimorés region.

Today, Espírito Santo has valuable assets in the push for economic development: A privileged geographical location, rich reserves of radioactive minerals on the coast, one of the largest ore ports in the world, and the second-largest oil production in Brazil.

== Pre-Columbian period ==
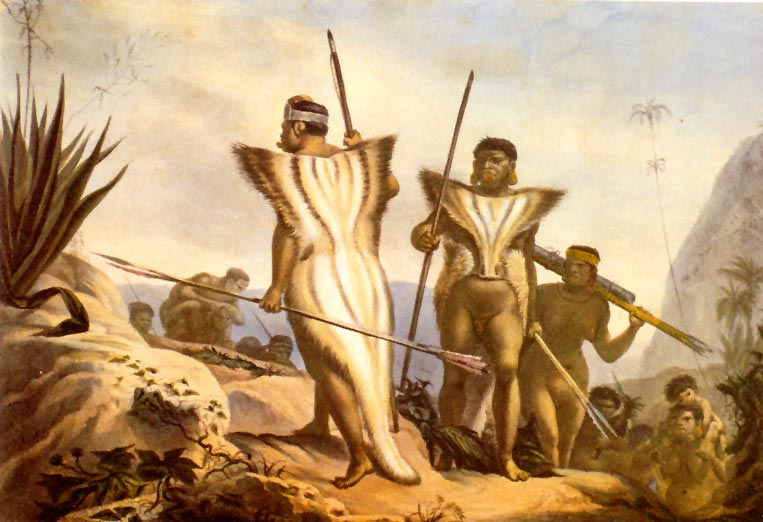
Family of Botocudo Indians.

Initially, the region was inhabited by several indigenous tribes, such as the Aimoré and Goitacá. Most Indians belonged to the Tupi trunk. The tribes in the remote areas were called Botocudos, and were attributed to hostile and bellicose behavior and the practice of anthropophagy. On the coast, the tribes were also hostile, but with different habits.

== The first expeditions ==
The first expedition to explore the coast of Espírito Santo left Portugal in 1501, with the navigator Americo Vespucci on board. Other expeditions in the following years, such as the one by Pedro Álvares Cabral, discovered and explored areas off and on the eastern coast of Brazil.

== Early days ==
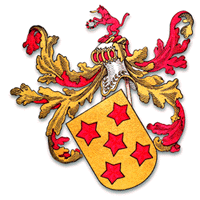
Coat of arms of Vasco Fernandes Coutinho.

On May 23, 1535, the Portuguese nobleman Vasco Fernandes Coutinho, veteran of the campaigns in Africa and India, docked in the lands of the captaincy, which had been assigned to him by King John III of Portugal. As it was a Whit Sunday, he named the village to be built on the land he was granted (Note: Fifty leagues of coast, between the Mucuri and Itapemirim rivers, with as much inland, from the point where the portion granted to Pero de Campos Tourinho, donee of the Captaincy of Porto Seguro, ended in the north.)'Espírito Santo' (Portuguese for "holy spirit"). Today, Vila do Espírito Santo is the city of Vila Velha. In 1535, the village became a captaincy, in 1822 a province, and in 1889 a state.

The establishment of the village consisted of a series of struggles, as the natives did not give up their lands to the Portuguese without resistance. They retreated to the forest, where they concentrated to start a guerrilla warfare that lasted, with small truces, until the middle of the 17th century. Vasco Fernandes Coutinho's undertaking was thus one of the hardest. For the patriarch of Espírito Santo, the captaincy that was initially a prize turned into punishment; he had to commit all his possessions to preserve his village and ended up dying poor.

Besides the insubordination of the natives, the donee had to face dissension among the Portuguese. To his companions Jorge de Meneses and Duarte Lemos he granted extensive sesmarias, (Note: A Portuguese system, adapted in Brazil, which regulated the distribution of land for agricultural production.) using the powers he had received along with the letter of donation. With this, he created two rivals.

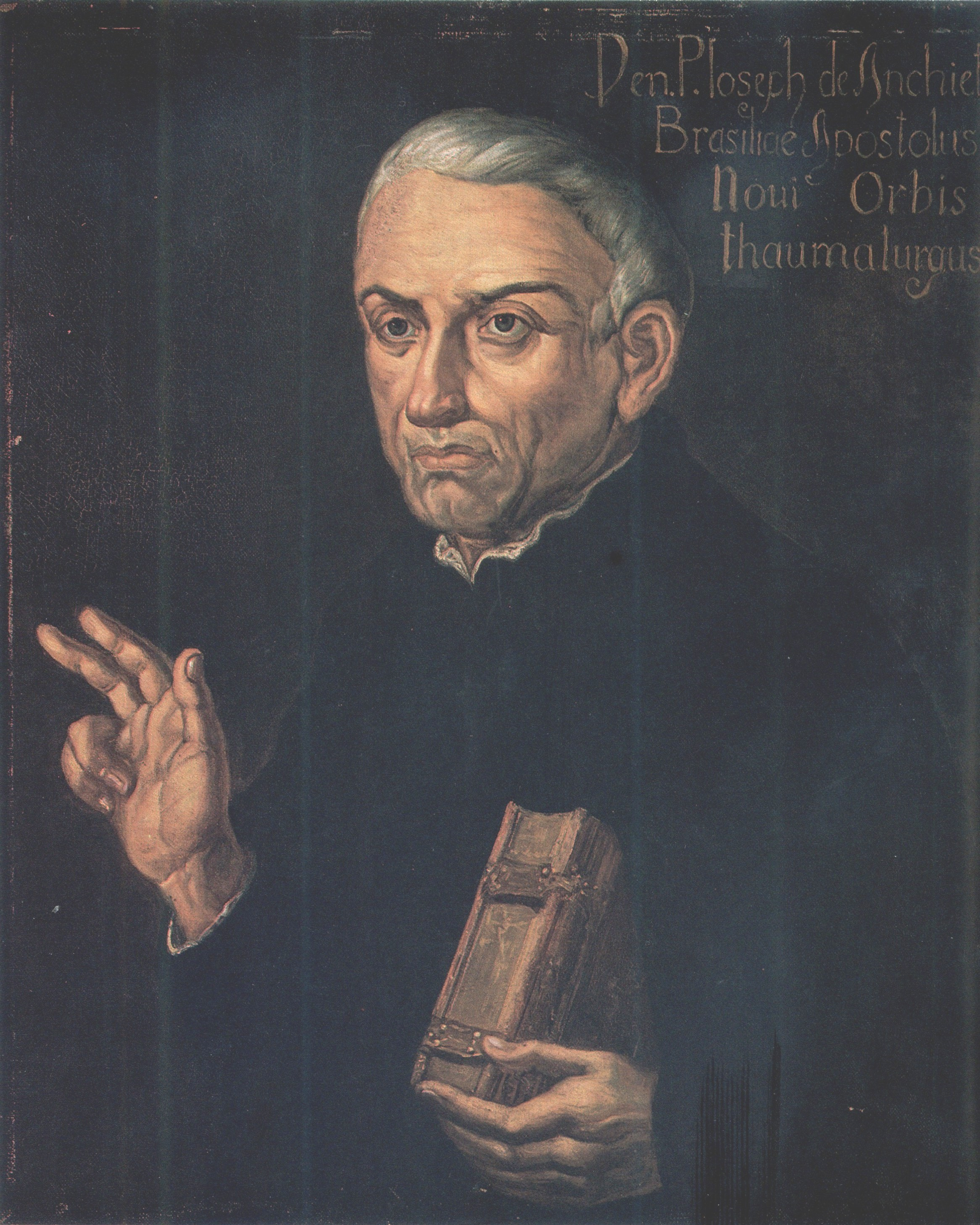
Joseph of Anchieta (1534-1597).

Duarte de Lemos founded Vitória - at the time called Vila Nova - on the island of Santo Antônio, in a strategic position, more advantageous than Vila Velha for defense against the constant attacks of the natives. At the same time, Jesuit missionaries arrived and engaged in catechesis, which caused clashes with the settlers, who preferred to dominate the indigenous peoples through slavery. Since 1561, the Jesuit Joseph of Anchieta had chosen the village of Reritiba as his refuge, from where he had to be constantly away, due to his duties, either in São Paulo, Rio de Janeiro, or Bahia. He wrote two poems in Reritiba: "De Beata Virgine dei Marte Maria" ("Of the Holy Virgin Mary Mother of God") and "De Gestis Mendi de Saa" ("Of the deeds of Mem de Sá"). The latter describes the Battle of Cricaré, an epic of a squadron sent from Bahia by Mem de Sá, general governor of Brazil, to the rescue of Vasco Fernandes Coutinho and his people, who were under siege by the Tamoio on the island of Vitória. The largest force of the indigenous was concentrated in a fortified village by the Cricaré River. The decisive battle took place there, on May 22, 1558. The Portuguese, though victorious, suffered heavy casualties. Among the dead were Mem de Sá's son, Fernão de Sá, who commanded the squadron; and two sons of Caramuru (Diogo Álvares Correia) with the Indian woman Paraguaçu.

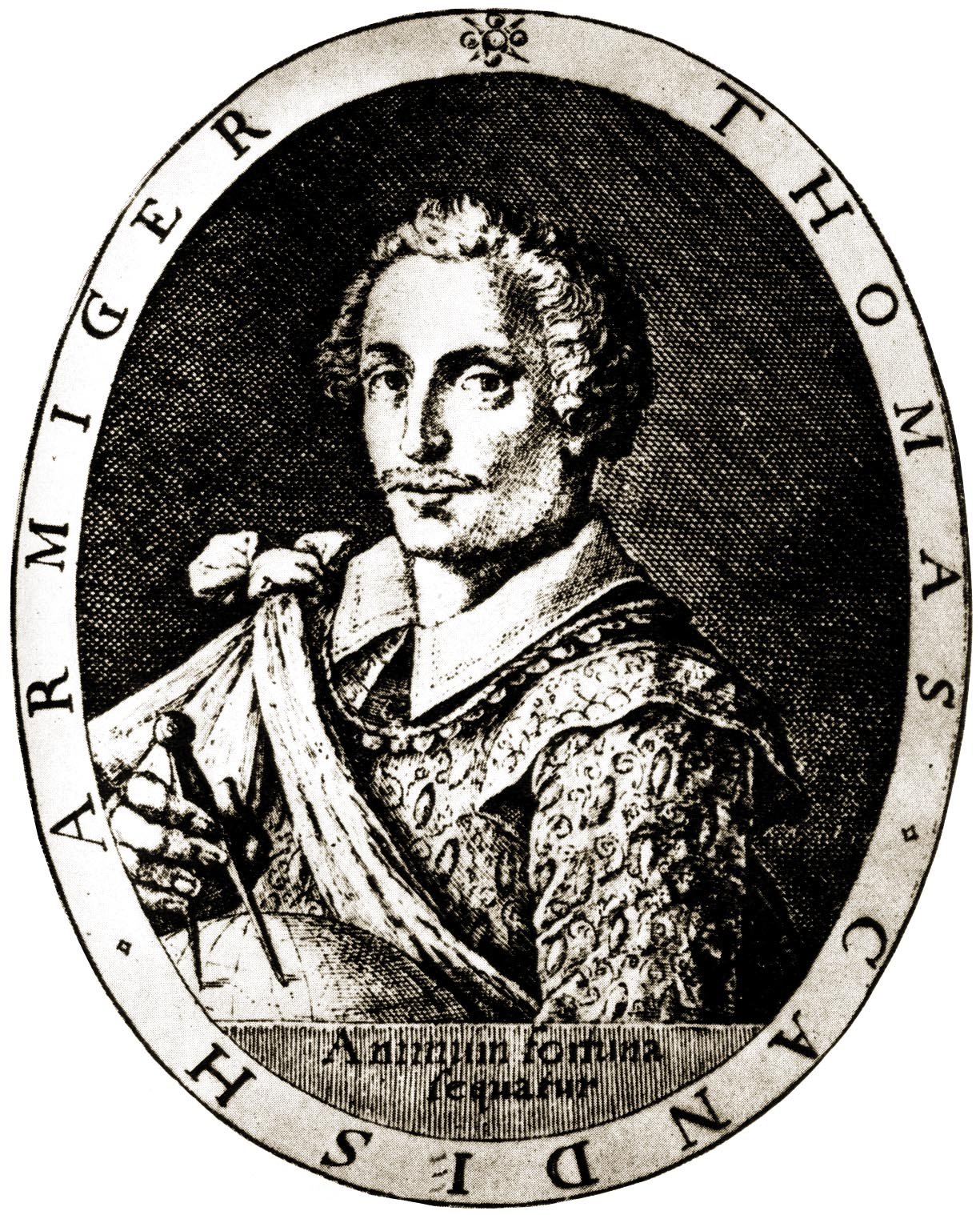
Thomas Cavendish (1555-1592)

The strategic position of the captaincy, given its proximity to Rio de Janeiro, led to some foreign invasion attempts. In 1592, the Capixabas (natives to the state) repulsed an English onslaught, under the command of Thomas Cavendish. In 1625, the donee Francisco de Aguiar Coutinho faced the first Dutch attack, commanded by Pieter Pieterszoon Hein, a fight in which the heroine Maria Ortiz stood out. In 1640, with seven ships, the Dutch attacked Espírito Santo again, under the command of Colonel Koin. They managed to land 400 men but were repelled by the captain major ("capitão-mor") João Dias Guedes and did not settle in Vitória. They then attacked Vila Velha, from where they were also repulsed. The colonial government, faced with such repeated attacks, decided to send forty infantrymen from the regular troop to Vitória. On this occasion, the captaincy progressed and Koin captured two ships carrying sugar that, hit by land fire, were almost completely damaged.

The depletion of the population, which in the early days threatened several times to desert the captaincy, as well as the inability to continue its incipient agriculture, revealed the weakness of the foundations on which the local colonization was based. There, too, private resources proved insufficient to maintain such a difficult and costly enterprise.

In 1627, Francisco de Aguiar Coutinho died, whose successor, Ambrósio de Aguiar Coutinho, was not interested in the lordship and continued as governor in the Azores. A succession of captains followed, with frequent and serious disagreements between them and the council officers. Upon coming of age, in 1667, Antônio Luís Gonçalves da Câmara Coutinho, the last descendant of the first donee, was appointed captain major by Antônio Mendes de Figueiredo, an esteemed governor. In 1674, the purchase of the territory from the last donee of the Câmara Coutinho family was made by the Bahia nobleman Francisco Gil de Araújo, for forty thousand cruzados, a transaction confirmed by a royal letter of March 18, 1675.

== Emeralds ==
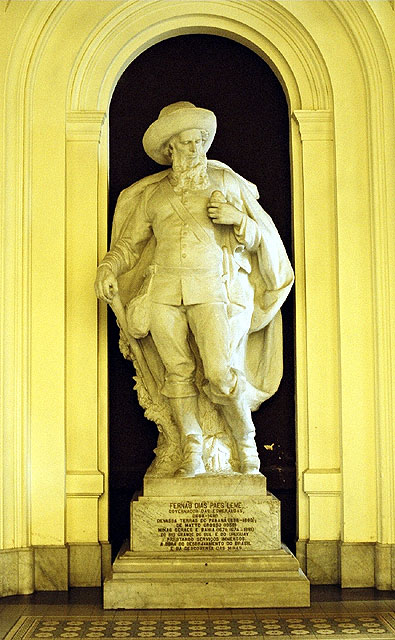
Sculpture by Fernão Dias Pais, exhibited at the Paulista Museum.

Under the new donee's government, trade and farming developed, but the main reason for buying the captaincy was frustrated: The discovery of emeralds. This search had begun at the initiative of the general government and the cycle was limited to a few relevant expeditions, whose importance lied less in the results obtained, than in the dynamization of interest in the area and greater knowledge of the countryside. Among the most notable were Diogo Martins Cão (1596), Marcos de Azeredo (1611), and Agostinho Barbalho de Bezerra (1664), who searched the vicinity of the Doce River. Francisco Gil de Araújo founded the village of Nossa Senhora de Guarapari and built the forts of Monte do Carmo and São Francisco Xavier. The one of São João, found in ruins, was rebuilt.

Gil de Araújo promoted 14 expeditions across the Rio Doce, heading to the Serra das Esmeraldas, which may have had contact with the Paulistans (bandeirantes) of Fernão Dias Pais. Francisco Gil's activity and capital expenditure did not result in any metalliferous discoveries, although there were some gains in land valuation, through the establishment of settlers and the creation of new engenhos. The profits, however, did not compensate for the investment made. His son and heir, likely for this reason, preferred to stay away from the lordship and, after his death, the captaincy became vacant and was sold to the crown by Cosme Rolim de Moura, a cousin of the last donee. As a result, Espírito Santo was submitted to the jurisdiction of Bahia.

During the 18th century, the interest in mining persisted, revived by Antônio Rodrigues Arzão's discovery of a small quantity of gold in the Doce River, in 1692. Numerous enterprises followed, beginning with the opening of the road to Minas Gerais, while the deposits of Castelo and other places attracted residents from neighboring captaincies. A new impulse of conquest and occupation of the countryside was witnessed, and the concessions of sesmarias favored the settlement of enterprising individuals. The movement aroused the attention of the Bahian authorities and ended up being hampered by the care of the royal monopoly and fear of a foreign invasion of Minas Gerais from Espíriro Santo. Measures were then taken to better fortify the captaincy, while by order of the king, it was forbidden to continue explorations. The opening of entrances to the mines was prevented. The captaincy defended itself from maritime attacks and was isolated by natural defenses: Closed forests and Indians fighting for their territories. Colonization, therefore, continued without further progress, although in 1741 the comarca of Vitória was created, which covered São Salvador de Campos and São João da Barra. In 1747, the ombudsman Manuel Nunes Macedo described the situation in Vitória as follows:

"Here there is no jail or town hall, because they fell down and my predecessors did not take care in rebuilding them (...) for the City Council has no income."

The obstinacy of the miners and the improvements made in the defense system eventually weakened the prohibitions, and in 1758, according to a royal order, a road to the mines was opened and a discharge post was established in the village of Campos.

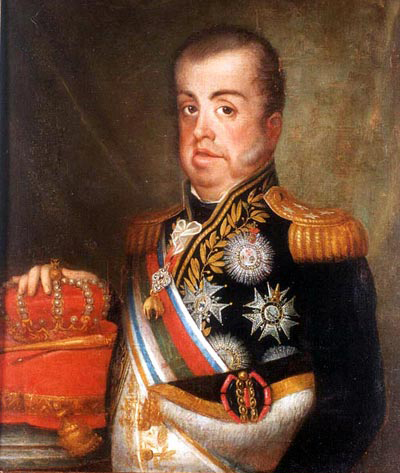
John VI of Portugal.

In 1797, the regent John VI addressed the governor of Bahia in the following terms:

"Since it is my particular duty to revive the almost extinct captaincy of Espírito Santo, entrusted until now to ignorant and not very zealous captains, I was served to nominate a private governor for it, who is now subordinate to you, and to choose a name of known lights and prestige in the person of the Frigate captain Antônio Pires da Silva Pontes."

The new governor took office on March 29, 1800. The main objective of the recovery work was to improve communication with Minas Gerais. On October 8 of the same year, Silva Pontes signed the act, together with the representative of the government of Minas Gerais, which regulated the collection of taxes between the two captaincies. He was also interested in the navigation of the Doce River, the opening of roads, the expansion of crops, and the settlement of the land. In 1810, the captaincy became autonomous from Bahia and responded directly to the general government. At that time, Manuel Vieira de Albuquerque Touvar ruled, who did not deviate from Silva Pontes' program. He named the ancient ruins of the village of Coutins Linhares.

The colonial period ended under better auspices, mainly due to the diligence of Francisco Alberro Rubim, appointed governor in 1812. Rubim was the author of the Memória estatística da capitania do Espírito Santo ("Statistical memory of the Espírito Santo captaincy"), written in 1817, in which he stated that at the time there were 24,587 inhabitants, six villages, eight hamlets, and eight freguesias. The occupation of the territory was consolidated and the demographic base expanded. In face of the difficulties of the time, these data demonstrate relevant progress.

On March 20, 1820, Baltazar de Sousa Botelho de Vasconcelos was sworn in as governor, and had to deal with the agitated days of independence and pass the administration to the provisional government board. Even before the promulgation of the constitution of the empire, the ombudsman Inácio Acióli de Vasconcelos was appointed president of the province.

== Province Development ==
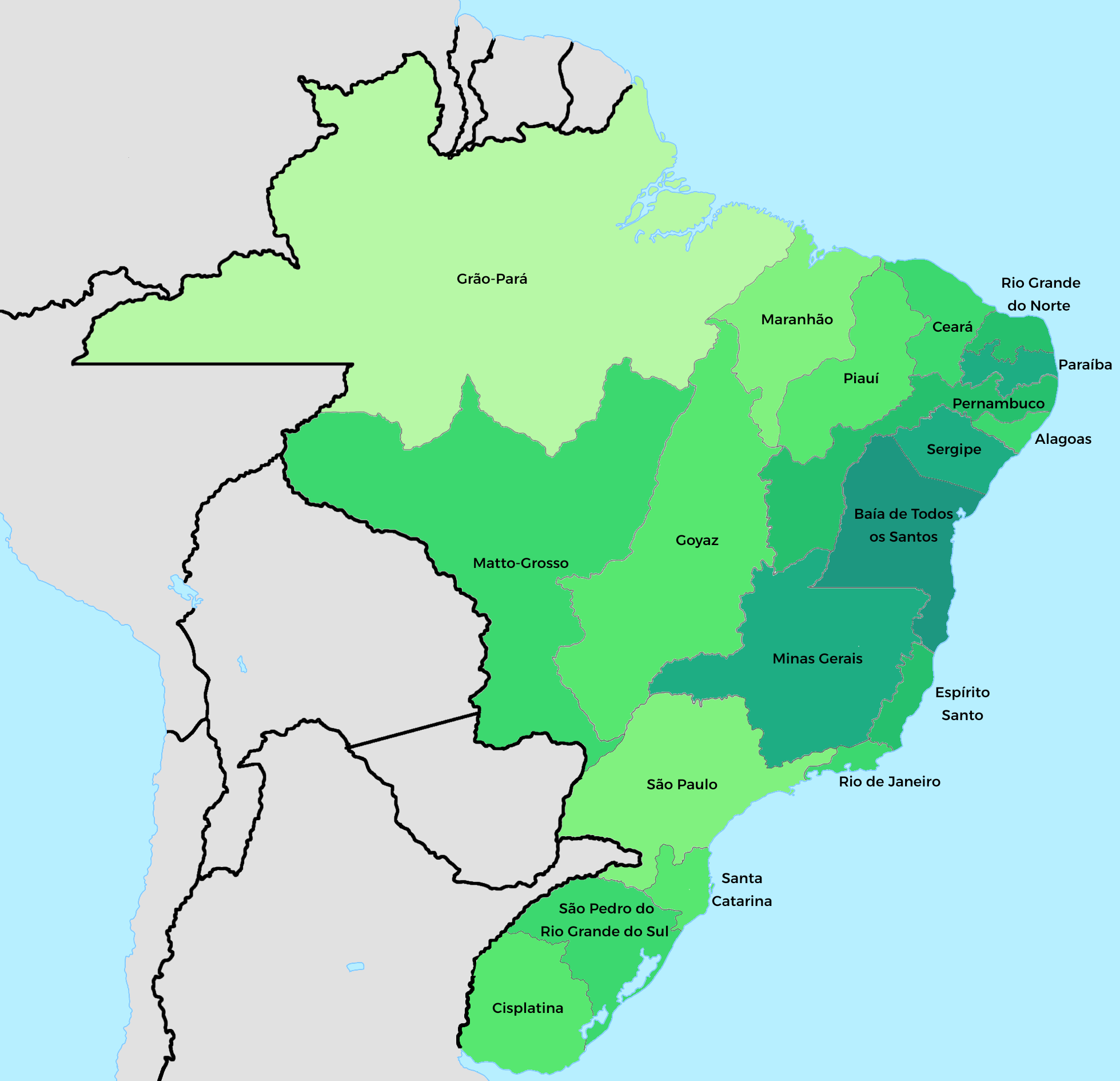
Imperial Provinces of Brazil in 1822.

During the independence movement, in March and April 1821, several political commotions occurred in Espírito Santo, while the choice of its representatives happened in the courts of Lisbon. After the proclamation of Brazilian autonomy, full support was given to the new political reality, and on October 1, 1822, Pedro I was immediately recognized as emperor of Brazil.

The provincial government faced an economic crisis in the early 1820s, caused by the strangulation of agricultural production due to a prolonged drought. Even so, coffee cultivation began. To this end, the government encouraged the use of land by foreign settlers, which occurred simultaneously with the arrival of farmers from Rio de Janeiro, Minas Gerais, and São Paulo. Following the example of the other southern provinces, in Espírito Santo this colonizing experience was based on small agricultural property, which soon spread along the central highland area, in contrast to the southern areas of that region, where large property predominated.

In 1846, the Santa Isabel colony was founded with German immigrants from Hunsrück and in 1855 a private society - later taken over by the government - created the Rio Novo colony with Swiss, German, Dutch, and Portuguese families. Between 1856 and 1862, there was a considerable influx of German immigrants to the colony of Santa Leopoldina, whose headquarters was the port of Cachoeiro de Itapemirim, on the Itapemirim river, fifty kilometers from the mouth, in the south of the state. The colonies of Santa Isabel and Santa Leopoldina created offshoots across the plateau, between the Jucu and Santa Maria rivers, and later crossed the Doce River.

In the colonization process, the immigrants faced, besides other difficulties, the indigenous predicament in the Rio Doce region. Despite the efforts to create villages and the attempts to use their labor, there was a succession of clashes with the settlers, and there was a more serious dispute between Indians and residents of Cachoeiro de Itapemirim, in 1825, with a high number of dead and wounded, Two decades later, the commander and future baron of Itapemirim, Joaquim Marcelino da Silva Lima, still tried to organize a large village based on vacant lands.

== Influence of agriculture ==
In the republic, the state of Espírito Santo contributed effectively to the country's progress. The sugar cane fields had been replaced by coffee trees. No sugar mills had yet been founded. The central mills were gradually disappearing. Besides the farmers from Espírito Santo, who started to cultivate coffee, people from Rio de Janeiro, Minas Gerais, and São Paulo, such as the Baron of Itapemirim and went to the state to work with coffee.

Thanks to the fruitful work of these settlers, when slavery of the blacks was abolished - which overthrew the large farms - the economy of Espírito Santo endured and provided its presidents after the republic was proclaimed with the means necessary for undertakings such as the construction of railroads, expansion of education and organization of urban plans. Muniz Freire installed water, electricity, and sanitation infrastructure; electric streetcars; an industrial park; a power plant; and a sugar mill in Cachoeiro de Itapemirim; a model farm in Cariacica, as well as reform of the public educational system and building schools and bridges. These and other works were carried out with resources coming mainly from the coffee produced by the colonies of European immigrants organized since the empire.

With the railroad irradiation that coffee gave rise to in the mid-19th century, Espírito Santo benefited from the railroad network, whose center was in Campos dos Goytacases and that established a connection between two important coffee growing areas: Zona da Mata, in Minas Gerais, and the south of Espírito Santo. Despite being located outside the cultivation region, the city of Vitória was the one that most progressed with the coffee boom, and in 1879, the first studies were made for the construction of a port, which should allow for the transportation of the entire production of the province. Meeting the new demands, in the middle of the century, the press of the state of Espírito Santo began to function, with the circulation of the newspaper O Correio da Vitória, owned by Pedro Antônio de Azeredo, starting in 1849.

In 1850, Espírito Santo had ten municipalities: Vitória, Serra, Nova Almeida, Linhares, São Mateus, Espírito Santo, Guarapari, Benevente (now Anchieta), and Itapemirim. Shortly before, the province had lost part of its lands due to the disannexation of Campos dos Goytacases and São João da Barra, returned to Rio de Janeiro in 1832. This dispute resolved in 1900.

== Abolition ==
At the end of the 19th century, the population of the state, especially the intellectuals, joined the abolitionist movement. As happened in the other provinces, associations linked to emancipation arose, such as the Abolitionist Society of Espírito Santo ("Sociedade Abolicionista do Espírito Santo") (1869) alongside a fierce journalistic and parliamentary campaign. A liberation society was founded in the very building of the Municipal Chamber of Vitória (1883). During the propaganda, the cruelty of the punishments inflicted on slaves was evoked, as had happened after the insurrection of about 200 blacks in the district of Queimados in 1849.

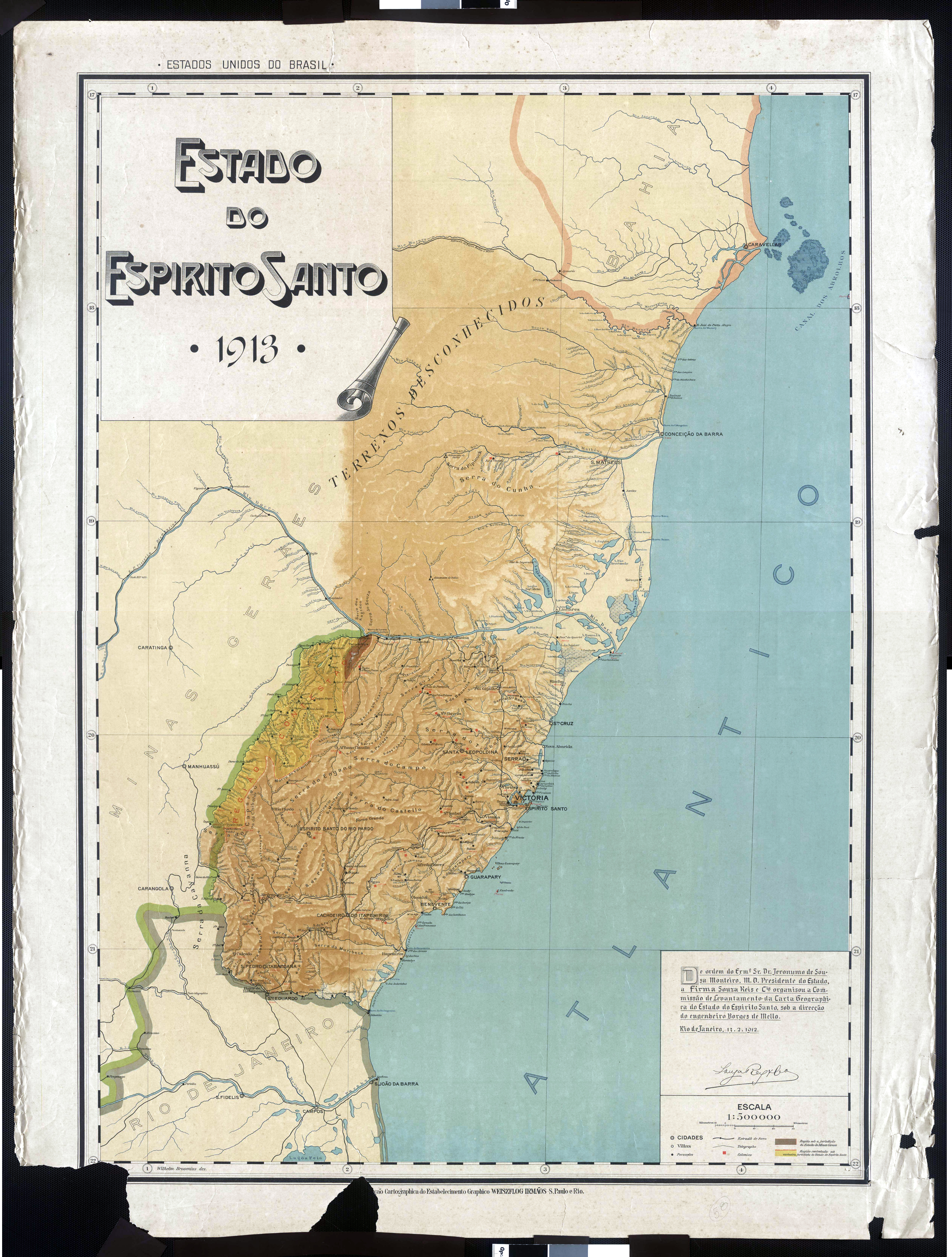
Map of Espírito Santo in 1913

The abolition of slavery, however, led the large landowners to ruin, due to the deprivation of their traditional labor force. Thus, with the advent of the republic, the first governor of the state did not find material conditions to carry out the plans recommended by the republican propaganda. The finances of the former province were exhausted.

== Economic growth ==
The occupation of the north of Espírito Santo only began in the first decades of the 20th century and gained new momentum after the construction of the Colatina bridge over the Doce River, inaugurated in 1928. The Espirito Santo economy relied on the migration of contingents from the south and center of the country and the cultivation of coffee, which accounted for 95% of the revenue in 1903. During World War I, the port of Vitória was the second largest national exporter.

With the Revolution of 1930, João Punaro Bley took charge of the state, as intervenor, and was kept by the Estado Novo until 1943, under whose administration the port of Vitória and the construction of an ore dock were started. In 1945, under the administration of Jones dos Santos Neves, the Federal University of Espírito Santo (UFES) was created, the first initiative concerning higher education in the state. To expand the export of iron ore from Minas Gerais, Vale S.A. built the port of Tubarão in Vitória, with the capacity to store one million tons of ore, receive ships of up to one hundred thousand tons and load them at a rate of six thousand tons per hour. Construction began in 1966 and was completed in record time. Located ten kilometers north of the capital, it is one of the largest ore ports in the world. With the transfer to Tubarão of most iron ore exports, the port of Vitória was freed up for other uses.

With the installation of Tubarão, the region was endowed with an infrastructure that propitiated the emergence of a new industrial complex that contains an iron ore pellet plant, with a production capacity of two million tons per year. On November 29, 1983, ten years after work had begun, the Tubarão Steel Mill was inaugurated, representing a total investment of three billion dollars. The phase was marked by an intense industrialization effort promoted by the Economic Development Company of Espírito Santo (Codesp), later transformed into the Development Bank of Espírito Santo (Bandes). Factories for instant coffee, pasta, chocolate, tiles, and fruit preserves were installed, and projects were approved for the establishment of dairy, shoe, electrical material, edible oils, and citrus juice factories.

== 21st century ==
In November 2007, the expansion of the steel mill ArcelorMittal Tubarão (formerly Companhia Siderúrgica de Tubarão) was inaugurated to expand the annual production of steel slabs from 5 million to 7.5 million tons. The state is the largest producer of steel slabs in Brazil.

In April 2008, the Federal Police carried out Operation Welfare Aid ("Operação Auxílio-Sufrágio"), which dismantled a gang specializing in fraud against the Social Security Plan in the state. State deputy Wolmar Campostrini (from PDT) was accused of being the leader of the scheme. Because of bureaucratic procedures, the investigations have not yet been concluded and Campostrini retains his position.

In October 2008, the mayor of the capital, João Coser (from PT) was reelected in the first round. In 2010, Renato Casagrande (from PSB) was elected governor in the first round, with 82.3% of the votes.

From 2006, the precariousness of prisons started to be reported, as it caused rebellions, murders, and even dismemberments (in the Casa de Custódia de Viana); in 2009, prisoners were kept in steel containers, without proper ventilation, due to the lack of cells. In March 2010, this situation was discussed in a panel at the United Nations Commission on Human Rights. Partially fulfilling commitments made, the government deactivated the metal cells and demolished the Casa de Custódia de Viana in May 2010. In October, seven penitentiaries were inspected by a commission led by the Order of Attorneys of Brazil.

In 2014, the state when through one of the worst droughts in the last decades. The following year also presented a natural disaster, as the wave of waste from the dam collapse in Mariana, Minas Gerais, reached Espírito Santo.

In 2018, the new Vitória airport was inaugurated after a 10-year halt in construction (resumed in 2015).
