= Brazilian Institute of Museums =

Brazilian government agency

- Formation: 20 January 2009
- Founder: Department of Museums and Cultural Centers, of the Institute for National Historic and Artistic Heritage (Demu-Iphan)

The Brazilian Institute of Museums is an autonomous body linked to the Ministry of Culture, the managing body of the National Policy of Museums. Created by Law No. 11.906, on January 20, 2009, one of its main objectives is the promotion of programs and projects aimed at the organization, management, and development of museums. It works to improve the physical and structural conditions of museums, to promote greater articulation and exchange within the museum sector, and to expand and democratize public access to memory institutions. As museums are places of social transformation and development, another priority of the institute is to encourage and create tools that enable social empowerment for all those who have a desire for memory.

== History ==
The institutionalization of the museological sector in Brazil began during the Vargas Era (1930-1945), a milestone of public policies for culture in Brazil. In this period, we highlight the creation of the Museum Course (1932), responsible for the institutionalization of museum studies and museology in Brazil, and the establishment of the Inspectorate of National Monuments (1934), one of the main antecedents of SPHAN - from which derives the origin of Iphan/MinC and, finally, of Ibram - within the National Historical Museum, in the city of Rio de Janeiro, RJ.

In the 2000s, the National Museum Policy (PNM) was launched, the first document to establish conceptual guidelines for the role of museums and the right to memory of the Brazilian society. The PNM was built in a democratic way with the participation of the museological sector from all over the country in 2002 and launched on May 16, 2003, in a ceremony held at the Museu Histórico Nacional (National Historical Museum), in the city of Rio de Janeiro (RJ), attended by the Minister of Culture Gilberto Gil.

In compliance with the PNM, and as a first step towards the creation of a specific agency for the management of public policies for museums, the Department of Museums and Cultural Centers (Demu) was created in 2004, under the Institute of National Historic and Artistic Heritage (Iphan).

On January 20, 2009, the President of the Republic Luiz Inácio Lula da Silva sanctioned Law 11.906, which made the Directorate of Museums and Museum Units independent from the Institute of National Historic and Artistic Heritage. Therefore, Ibram originated from the former Demu-Iphan, being responsible both for the National Museum Policy and for the direct administration of 30 federal museums, in 10 states of the federation.

As important results of this construction, we highlight, in particular, the instruments that have enabled the State to act more effectively in the regulation and consolidation of public policies in the field of museums and memory: the enactment of the Museum Statute (Law No. 11,904, of January 14, 2009), the creation of Ibram / MinC (Law No. 11,906, of January 20, 2009) and Decree No. 8,124 of October 17, 2013, which regulates the Statute, and the agency itself.

Always considering the Brazilian museological diversity, Ibram dialogues democratically with this rapidly expanding universe, composed of more than three thousand and seven hundred museums of multiple tendencies, carrying out actions of fomentation, acquisition and preservation of collections, as well as integration between the various actors of the sector.

On September 10, 2018, President Michel Temer signed Provisional Measure No. 850 authorizing the creation of the Abram (Brazilian Agency of Museums) and other provisions. This measure had negative repercussions among museum sector institutions.

== See also ==
- List of museums in Brazil
