= Vasco Fernandes Coutinho, captain of Espírito Santo =

Portuguese colonial administrator

Vasco Fernandes Coutinho
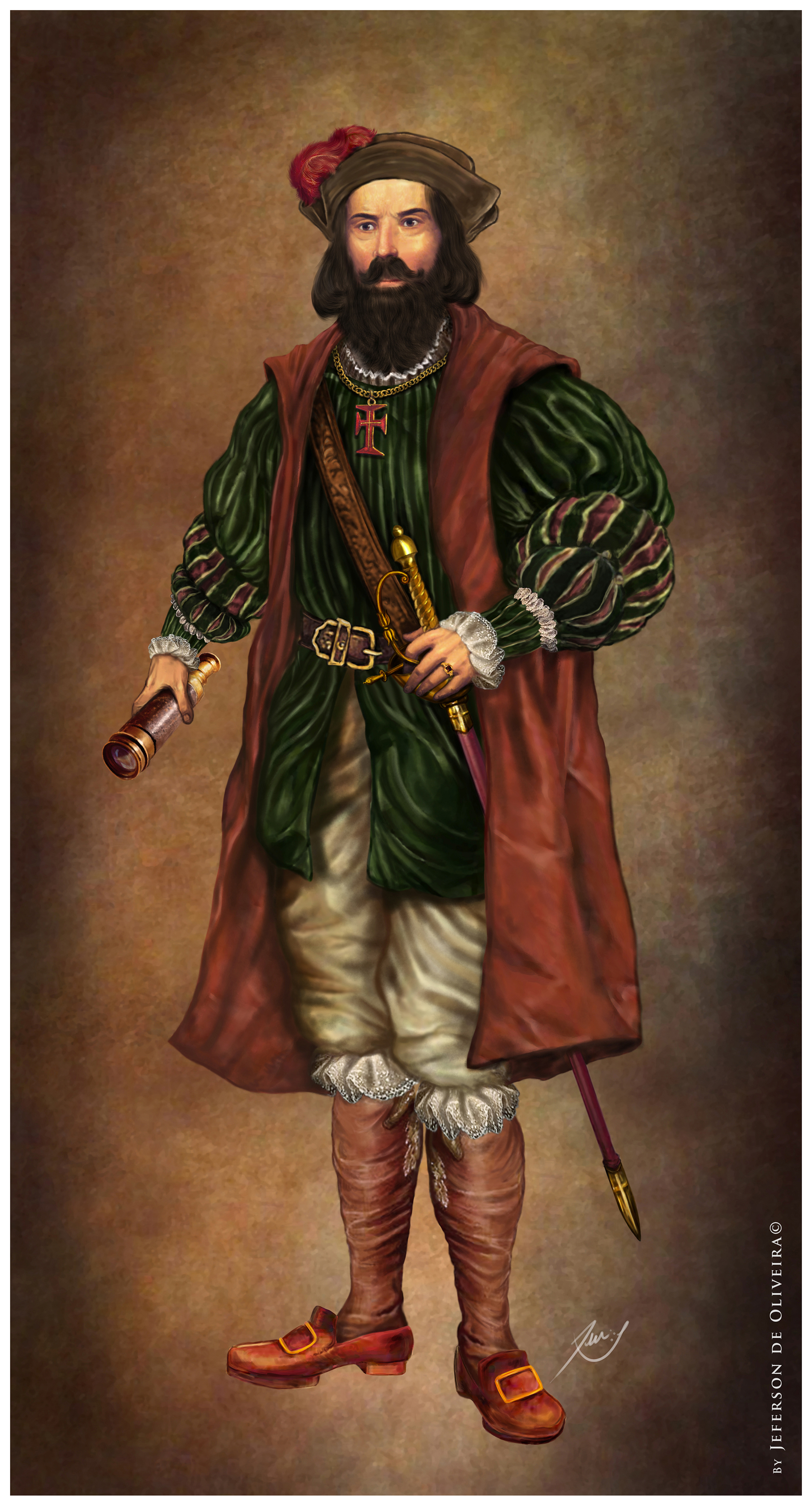

1st Captain-major of the Captaincy of Espírito Santo
- In office 23 May 1535 – 21 June 1561
- Monarchs: John III (1535–1557); Sebastian I (1557–1531)
- Succeeded by: Vasco Fernandes Coutinho Filho

Personal details
- Born: 1490 Serpa, Kingdom of Portugal
- Died: 1561 (aged 70–71) Vila Velha, Portuguese colony of Brazil
- Spouse(s): Maria do Campo; Ana Vaz de Almada
- Children: Jorge; Martim; Guiomar; Maria Catarina; Vasco Fernandes Filho
- Parents: Jorge de Melo (father); Branca Coutinho (mother)

Vasco Fernandes Coutinho (1490–1561) was a Portuguese fidalgo and the first donatary of the Captaincy of Espírito Santo, a colonial territory in what is now Brazil.

== Biography ==
Vasco Fernandes Coutinho was born in Portugal. He was later amongst the first 12 volunteers from Portugal to come to the newly discovered land of Brazil. In order to finance the crew and provisions needed to sail a single ship to Brazil, Coutinho sold everything he owned and took out loans. He was presented the area which became Espírito Santo and administered the colony for 25 years, despite being a military man by trade.

He founded both the first capital of Espírito Santo (today known as Vila Velha, "Old Town") and the current capital Vitória.

During his administration Espírito Santo's first two churches – São João and Rosário, both in Vila Velha – were founded in 1551. Both are still standing.

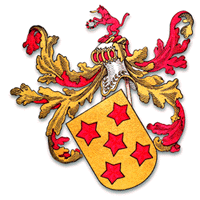
Coat of Arms of Vasco Coutinho

Political offices
Office created	1st Captain-major of the Captaincy of Espírito Santo; 1535–1561	Succeeded by Vasco Fernandes Coutinho Filho
