= Donatário =

Portuguese private colonial land governor

A donatário (Portuguese for "donated" or "endowed [one]"), sometimes anglicized as donatary, was a private person — often a noble — who was granted a considerable piece of land (a donataria) by the Kingdom of Portugal. The king exempted these titleholders from normal colonial administration; the donatários were comparable to a royal governor or a British Lord Proprietor. As the donataria were often captaincies, the position is also translated as captain.

== History ==
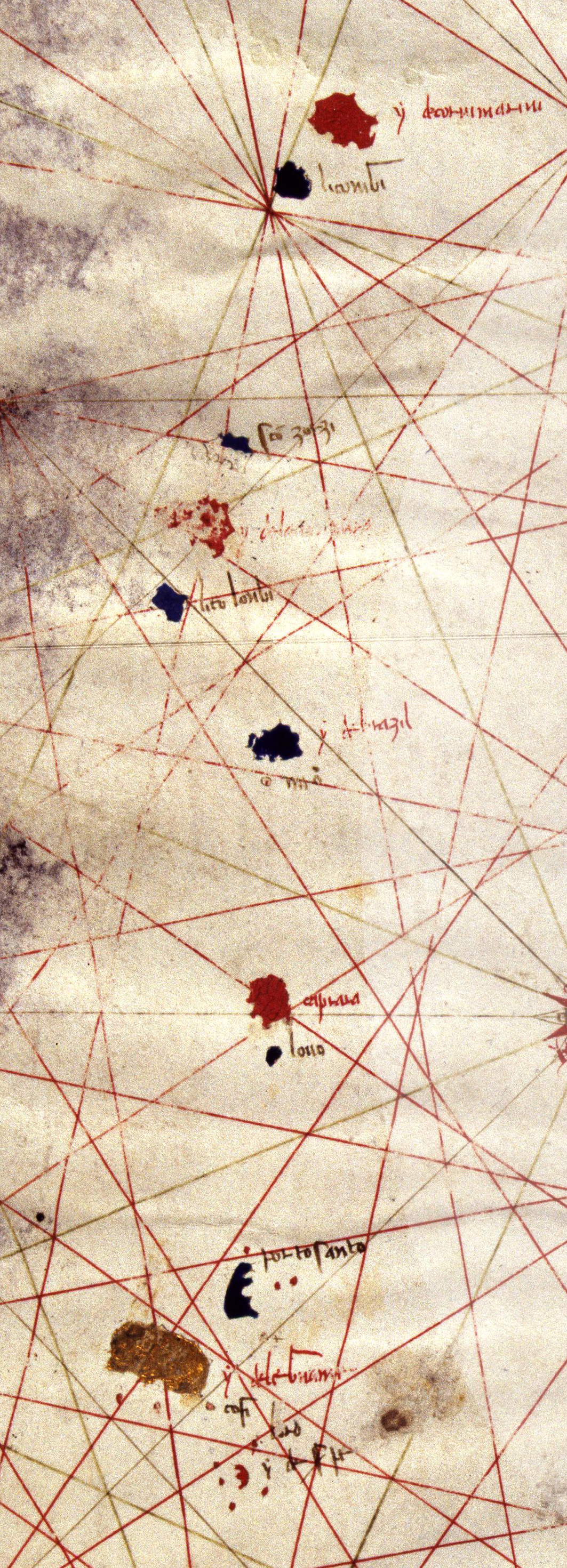
A anonymous Venetian map of the islands of the Azores (Biblioteca Nazionale Marciana), Venice

Normally, the donatário was the recipient of a captaincy, a territorial division and land grant, within Portuguese colonies. It was an effective administrative system that ceded certain rights and responsibilities to the donatário, facilitating the settlement of unpopulated places with little cost to the Crown.

The donatário was obligated to govern his territories under specific terms: in exchange for the grant, he received tax immunity, but was also responsible for promoting and settling new residents to his territory, establishing churches (following the Catholic faith), protecting them from frequent pirate attacks, and promoting agriculture and commerce. While the donatário assumed expenses of the settlement and economic development, he also benefited from various judicial and fiscal privileges, while the King maintained certain unalienable rights to safeguard the territorial and political unity of the Kingdom. Except for private land grants, the territory administrated by the donatário was turned over to settlers and the bestowed was responsible for all the expenses of the Captaincy.

Almost dictatorial in their powers, the donatários were limited by the difficulties of the territories they governed. With the Brazilian territories, which were large, the donatários' obligations covered the governorship, expansion and settlement of the territory, necessitating a large labour force, security forces and administrators. Many of the new settlers were criminals, opportunists or political exiles who arrived in these territories to make their fortunes (commercially or politically). At the same time, the donatário promoted the faith by receiving and assisting the Catholic missionaries that trekked across the Portuguese Empire.

=== Azores ===
After their discovery, the islands of the Azores were bestowed by the Crown of Portugal to Prince Henry the Navigator, son of King João I. The order of succession remained in the hands of the Dukes of Viseu and progressed as follows:

- Infante Henry, 1st Duke of Viseu, (1432-1460)
- Infante Ferdinand, 2nd Duke of Viseu (1460-1470)
- Infante John, 3rd Duke of Viseu (1470-1472)
- Infante Diogo, 4th Duke of Viseu (1472-1484)
- Infante Manuel, 5th Duke of Viseu (1484-1495)

The Dukes were the direct line to the Crown, as vassals of the Kings of Portugal. When Manuel, 5th Duke of Viseu, ascended the throne as King Manuel I of Portugal (1495), he incorporated the donatary privileges of the seven islands of the Azores (Corvo and Flores were not included) into the properties and possessions of the Crown.

The donatary system was bestowed upon Henry the Navigator at an unknown time, but his order to introduce livestock (goats, cattle, pigs, etc.) on the islands suggests that he would have received jurisdiction between 1432 and 1438. This was the same period as the death of King Duarte, and his successor King Afonso V exempted fees and taxes for five years at his request, suggesting Henry's compliance with the duties of a donatário. Yet it was only in his last will and testament that it was explicitly stated that he was protector of the Azores. The transfer of this title to his nephew the Infante Ferdinand, was in keeping with the Lei Mental proclaimed by his brother in 1434, that bound Henry to pass on all lands and goods from the King to legitimate male descendants. If not, then the Crown would regain ownership.

The donatário was expected to promote the settlement of the territory. Consequently, the hierarchical model that developed was an extension of this process. In order to govern the islands, Henry as donatário nominated men of confidence, capitães do donatário (Captains of the Donatary), to administer their territories locally. This three-tier system worked effectively: King, donatário, and captains allowed the administration of overseas territories without direct intervention of the Crown. (Note: Many of these donatary-captains were also represented by proxies, known as ouvidores do capitão (ombudspersons) whose responsibility was to locally manage their affairs, administer rental lands and "listen" to the local community.)

Yet the Crown oscillated between total neglect and strong vigilance; between the 15th-18th centuries the monarchy did not really know how to manage its territories. King Manuel I of Portugal, for his part, was a micro-manager and was involved in judicial affairs and exercised his duties as lord of the islands. This led to the creation of monarchial posts to directly influence control, such as the Corregedor, the Provedoria das Armadas (Office of the Purveyor of Armadas), 1527, and the Feitorias (Customs Offices) of Angra and Ponta Delgada, in 1561. These new posts showed the importance of the Crown's representatives in the regions over their control, and men like Cipriano de Figueiredo e Vasconcelos (Corregador of Terceira) would play important roles in coexistence between local and national administration.

After the 16th century the figure of the donatary captain lost its effective governorship in most of the islands of the Azores, with the exception of São Miguel, which was transformed into an honorific post, conferred by the King to people and noble families who he wished to honour. It was through this system that the majority of donatary captaincies fell into the hands of the high nobility of Portugal, who never lived on the islands or had little economic interest in their development.

== See also ==
- Captaincy
- Captain-major
- Captaincies of Brazil
