= Portuguese conquest of the East African coast =

1500–1509 conquest in southeast Africa

- Part of Portuguese colonization of Africa
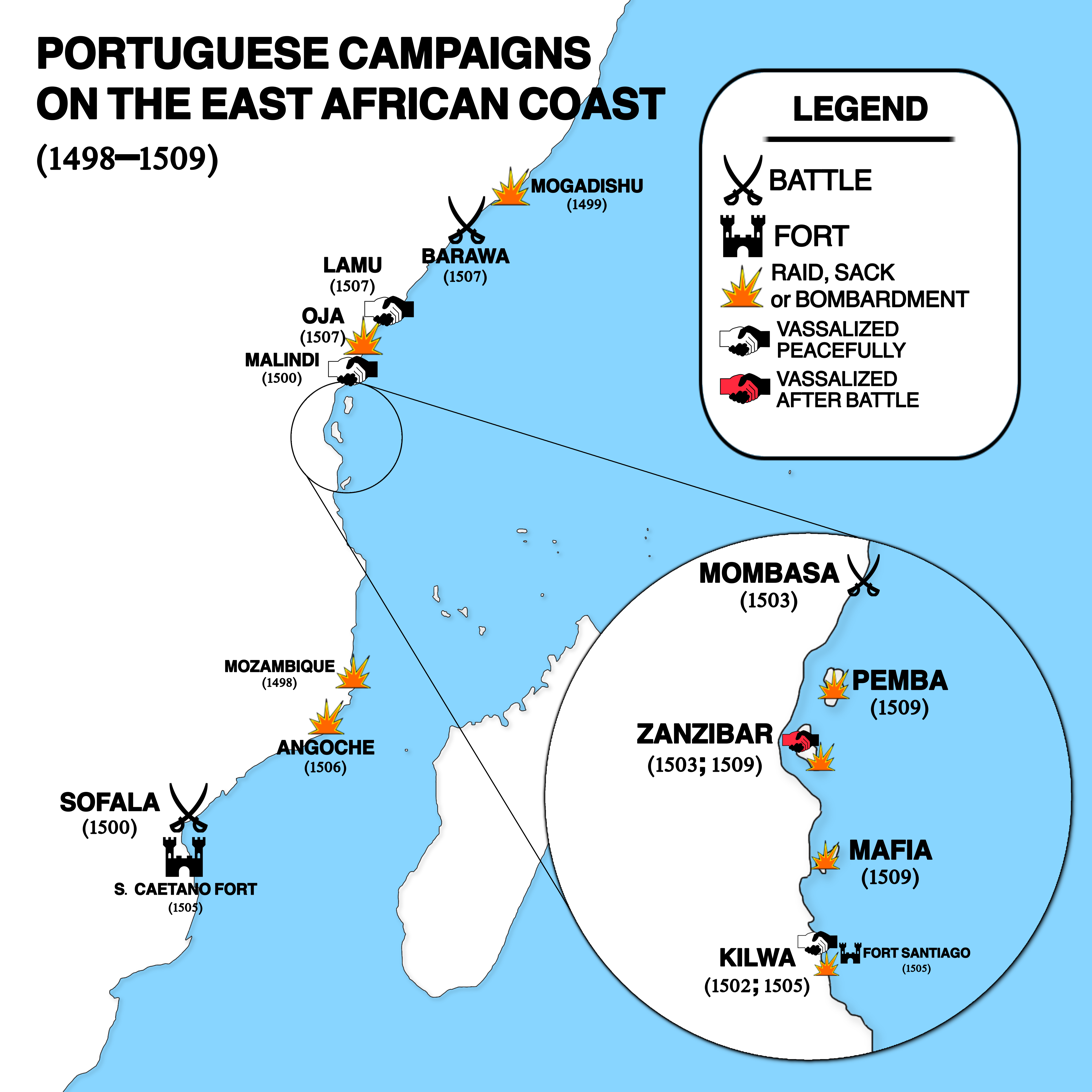
- Portuguese campaigns on the East African coast (1498–1509)
Date	1500 – 1509 (Note: From 1500 to 1509 or from 1498 to 1510)
Location	Southeast Africa
Result	Portuguese victory; All of South East Africa's coast is brought under Portuguese rule; Portugal gains full control of the Indian Ocean; Collapse of Indian Ocean commerce between Africa and Asia; Start of the Somali–Portuguese conflicts

Belligerents
(Portuguese Empire) Kingdom of Portugal	Ajuran Sultanate; Barawa; Island of Mozambique; Sultanate of Mogadishu; Sultanate of Kilwa; Zanzibar; Mombasa; Sofala; Angoche Sultanate; Oja; Lamu; Pate Island; Mafia Island; Pemba Island

Commanders and leaders
(Portuguese Empire) Pedro Álvares Cabral (Portuguese Empire) Vasco da Gama (Portuguese Empire) Rodrigues Ravasco (Portuguese Empire) Gomes Carrasco (Portuguese Empire) Francisco de Almeida (Portuguese Empire) Lourenço de Almeida (Portuguese Empire) Tristão da Cunha (Portuguese Empire) Afonso de Albuquerque (Portuguese Empire) Pêro de Anaia # (Portuguese Empire) Duarte de Lemos	Sultans

The Portuguese conquest of the East African coast was a series of military campaigns between 1500 and 1509, during which the Portuguese subdued and subjugated several coastal cities, converting them to vassal states and establishing dominance along the East African coast.

== Background ==
Route of Vasco da Gama's first voyage (1497–1499)

On July 8, 1497 Vasco da Gama left Lisbon with a fleet of four ships and a crew of 170 men. He rounded the Cape of Good Hope, eventually reaching Mozambique. on March 1, 1498,

The Portuguese at first hoped for a peaceful encounter, however, doubts arose when a boat with around a hundred men approached. Vasco da Gama allowed only four or five on aboard, fearing a trap. After a discussion, they returned ashore, and the local ruler sent a sheep and fruit as gifts, inviting the Portuguese to come ashore.

Yet, doubts still remained. The next evening, pilots from Mozambique who had accompanied the fleet escaped into the sea, that night, the captain tortured two local pilots. The Portuguese were threatened to be captured once they landed. That same night, two boats approached the ships, several men tried to cut their cables, but the attack failed.

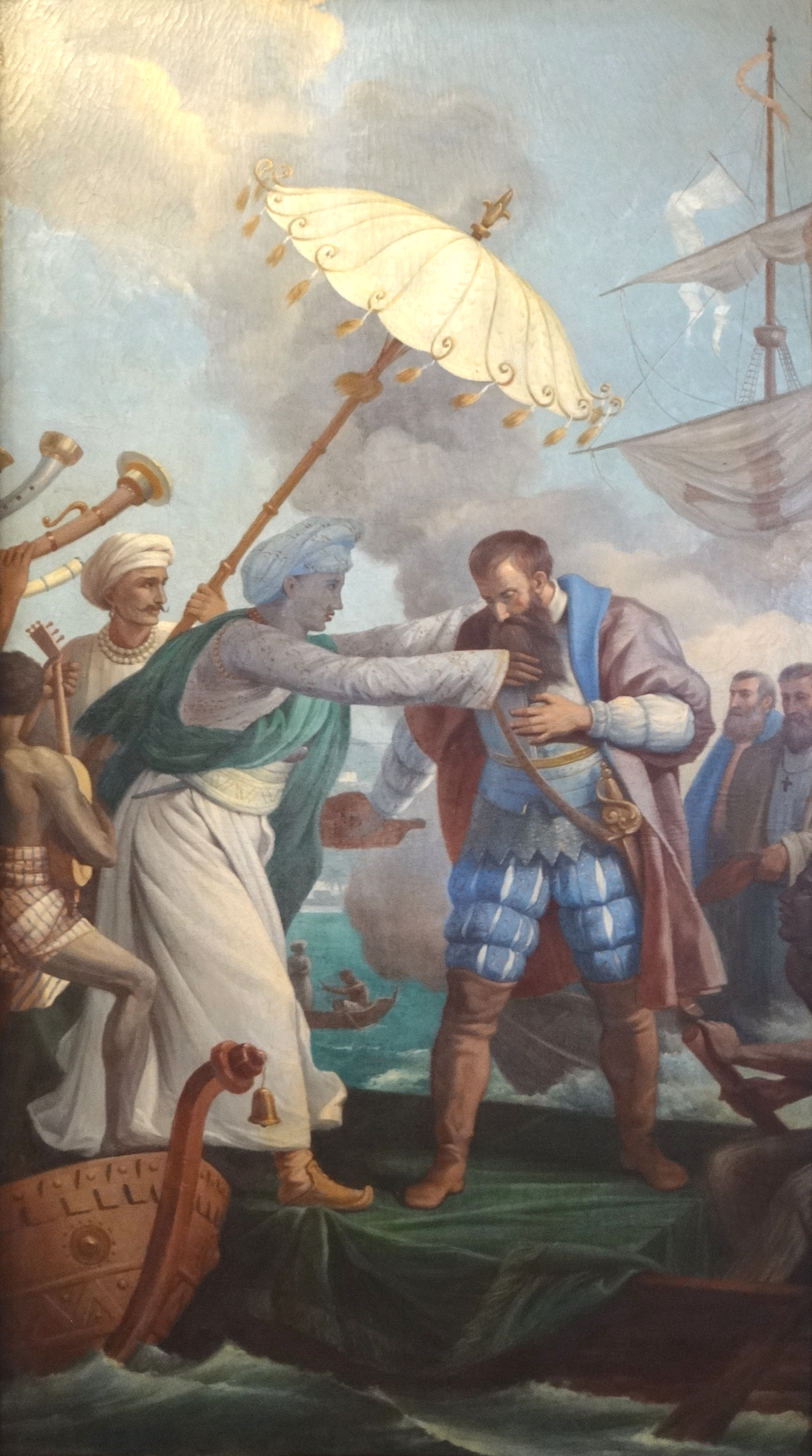
Vasco da Gama meets the Sultan of Malindi

In Malindi, Sultan Sayyid Ali welcomed Vasco da Gama when he learned that he was an enemy of the ruler of Mombasa. He offered supplies and provided a Gujarati pilot, Ahmed ibn Majid, to guide the fleet. On April 24, they resumed their voyage. In 1499, on his way back, he bombarded the city of Mogadishu and stopped at Malindi again, before sailing back down the coast.

Once Vasco da Gama departed, the coastal rulers were relieved and hoped he would not return. But da Gama had seen too much, he had learned that the coast had a great commercial life, that gold could be obtained at Sofala, and that there were many good harbors. Although the towns were hostile, the rivalries between the sultans would make them vulnerable to Portugal, as they were unlikely to unite against the foreign power.

== Course of hostilities ==
=== First attempts (1500) ===
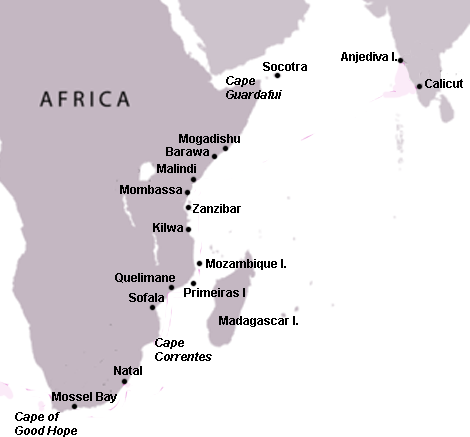
Principal cities of East Africa c. 1500

In 1500, Pedro Álvares Cabral set out for an expedition by order of the king of Portugal. During his expedition, his men spotted Sofala, but he was unable to conquer it.

=== Subjugation of Kilwa (1502) ===
In 12 July 1502, Vasco da Gama, in his second expedition, arrived before the port of Kilwa with his large fleet. The local ruler, Amir Ibrahim, refused to respond to Gama's letters. After consulting with his captains, Gama approached the shore in small vessels and threatened to bombard the city if no agreement was made. Faced with this threat, Amir Ibrahim capitulated and met Gama personally. Gama demanded a yearly tribute of 1,500–2,000 meticais of gold and ten pearls for the Portuguese Queen.

Later on 20 July 1502, Vasco da Gama issued a proclamation declaring Kilwa a vassal of Portugal.

=== Subjugation of Zanzibar (1503) ===
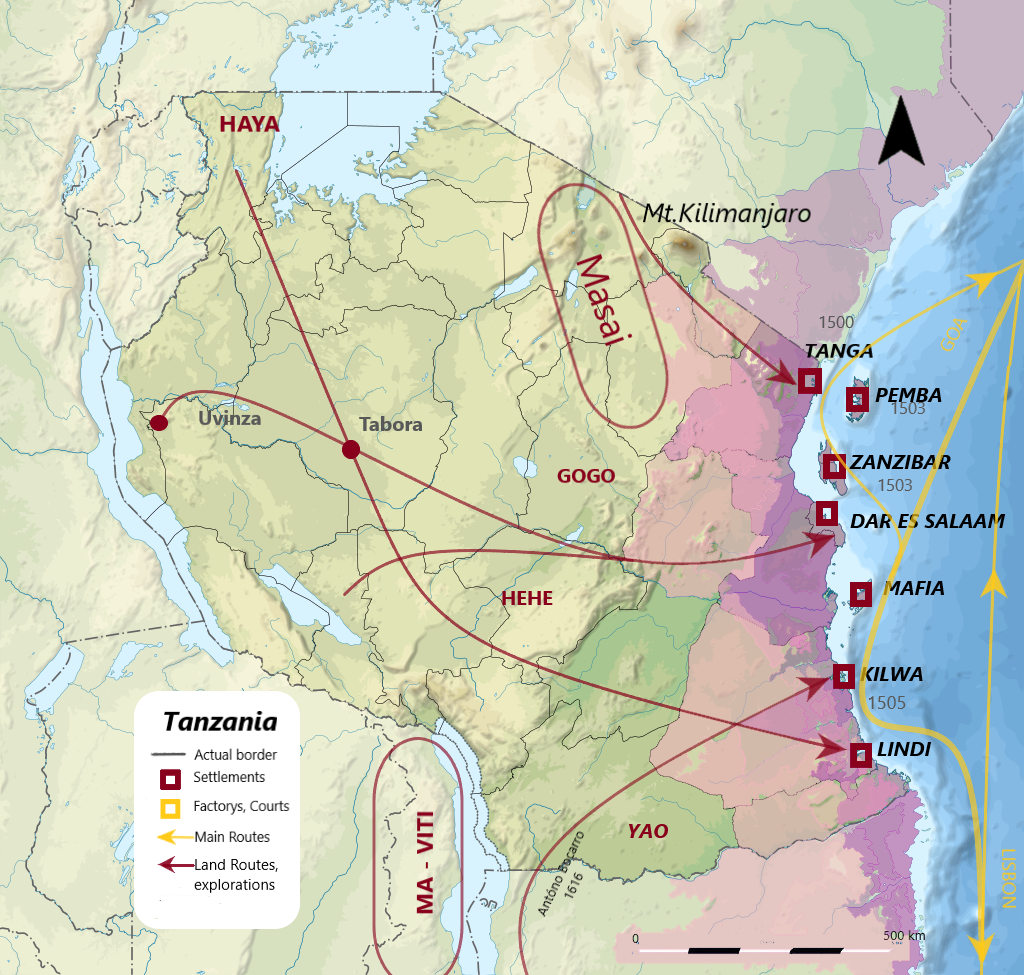
Portuguese presence in Tanzania

In 1503, António de Saldanha's fleet departed Lisbon to patrol the region near Cape Guardafui. However, after crossing the equator, the ships were separated due to bad weather. Rui Lourenço Rodrigues Ravasco's nau was the first to arrive at Mozambique Island, and he decided to target Zanzibar.

During a two month campaign, Rodrigues Ravasco captured over 20 wealthy ships filled with ambergris, ivory, tortoiseshell, wax, honey, rice, coir, and silk and cotton. When local traders ceased sending out ships due to his presence, he anchored at Zanzibar itself. The Sultan of Zanzibar demanded the return of the captured goods and the surrender of the Portuguese artillery, which Rodrigues Ravasco refused.

Rodrigues Ravasco sent a well armed boat led by Gomes Carrasco with 30 soldiers, including musketeers. The Portuguese attacked the enemy flotilla, forcing them to retreat. Only 4 zambucos resisted but were captured and taken back to the Portuguese nau.

Following this, the Sultan sent 4,000 of his men, who gathered on the beach under the command of the Sultan's son to prevent a Portuguese landing. Ravasco armed his boat and 2 captured zambucos with small cannons and musketeers and opened fire, capturing 20 Swahili and killing 34–35, including the Sultan's son. The Sultan requested peace and agreed to become a vassal state of Portugal, paying an annual tribute of 100 meticais and 30 sheep. Ravasco also forced Mafia, Zanzibar and other towns to pay tribute.

After subjugating Zanzibar, Rodrigues Ravasco sailed to Malindi, where an allied king requested Portuguese assistance in his war against Mombasa. Ravasco blockaded Mombasa's port, capturing 2 merchant ships and 3 zambucos. Among the prisoners were leaders from Barawa, who offered the city's vassalage to Portugal and an annual tribute of 500 meticais in exchange for their release and protect one valuable ship of theirs.

The blockade forced the King of Mombasa to abandon his campaign against Malindi and negotiate peace.

Despite the victory, the Portuguese did not occupy Zanzibar, and relations remained tense in the following years until an expedition led by Duarte de Lemos arrived to collect unpaid tribute, in 1510.

=== Sack of Kilwa (1505) ===
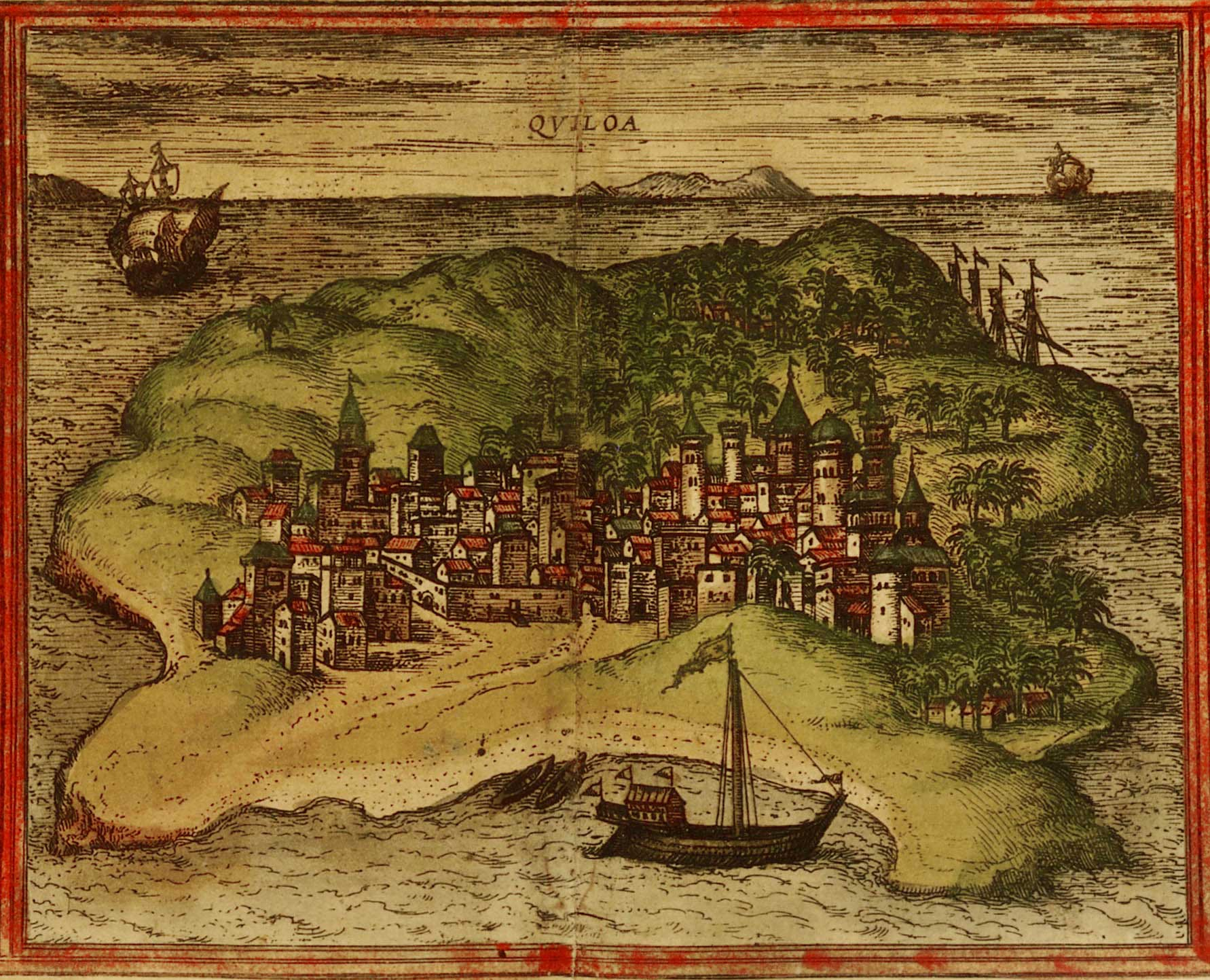
Kilwa Kisiwani, Civitates orbis terrarum vol. I, 1572

An year prior, in 1504, Kilwa had refused to pay tribute to Lopez Suarez.

On July 22, 1505, the Portuguese anchored off Kilwa. Two days later, the entire fleet, consisting of eight ships, gathered. Dom Francisco de Almeida entrusted a nobleman by the name of Pedro Cam who served as an Ensign with the Cross of Christ standard as the soldiers prepared to land.

Once ashore, the 500 troops were split into two groups. Dom Francisco led 300 men, while his son, Dom Lourenço, took command of 200, tasked with advancing along the shore to the king's palace. Dom Lourenço was to fire a gun as a signal, prompting his father to attack the town's center. At sunrise, Dom Lourenço gave the signal, and Dom Francisco's forces charged forward, shouting the war cry of Santiago. Despite the noise of trumpets and shouts, the Moors had yet to appear.

As Dom Francisco's forces advanced through the town, the defenders suddenly attacked from rooftops, throwing stones and shooting arrows, forcing the Portuguese soldiers to fight their way into the buildings to counter the ambush. The troops eventually cleared a path to the king's palace, where a fierce battle broke out. Though outnumbered, the Portuguese forced the defenders to retreat into the fortress.

A feigned surrender temporarily halted the fighting, allowing the king and his retinue to escape through a hidden door into a grove of palm trees. Dom Francisco chose not to pursue, deeming the terrain too risky. Instead, he allowed his men to sack the town, ensuring the protection of an ally, Mohamed Ancony.

=== Battle of Mombasa (1505) ===
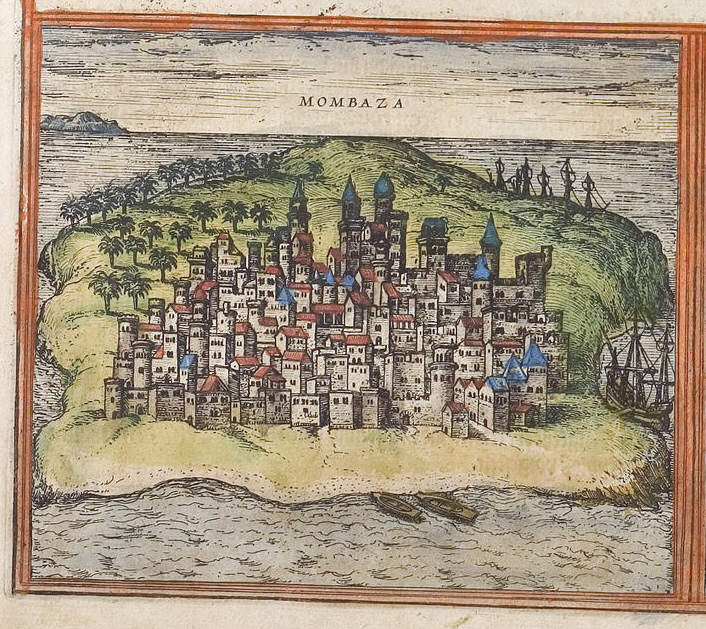
Mombasa, Civitates orbis terrarum vol. I, 1572

After Kilwa's destruction, the Sultan of Mombasa proposed an alliance with Malindi, ratified by the marriage of their children, but the Sultan of Malindi rejected the offer, preferring to negotiate with the Portuguese to reduce Mombasa's influence on the coast.

The Portuguese reached the harbour of the city on August 13, 1505. The harbour was protected by a small fort or bulwark, connected to the city by a short wall, and armed with eight guns. The fort opened fire on the first Portuguese ship to enter the harbour to sound it, the São Rafael, captained by Gonçalo de Paiva. After being silenced by the fire from the fleet, its garrison made no attempts to further resist the Portuguese and instead retreated into the town.

The next day in the afternoon, the Portuguese sailed up the river to the city front, where they were shot with guns, bows and stones, and subjected the city to a naval bombardment. Dom Francisco messaged the sultan, but the ruler only replied with insolent taunts.

The next day, they landed, divided in two squadrons and stormed the town. Despite heavy resistance and the very narrow streets, the Portuguese captured the settlement. The ruler of the town fled with many of its inhabitants to a nearby wood.

=== Siege of Fort São Caetano (1505) ===
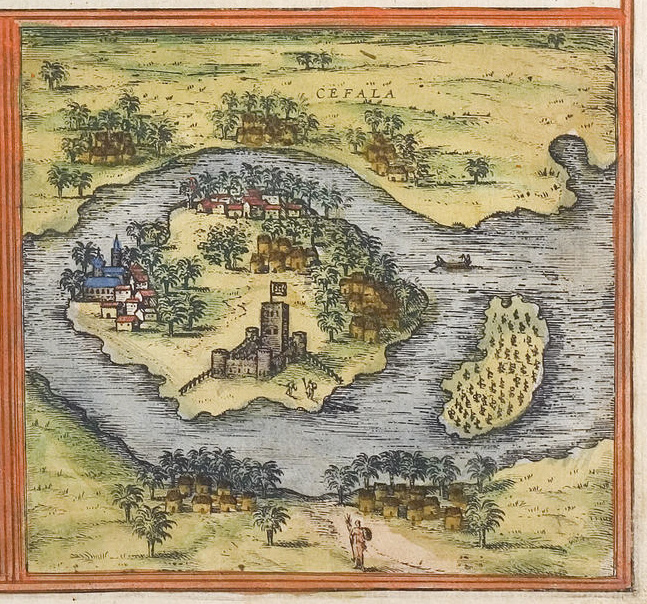
Fort São Caetano, Civitates orbis terrarum vol. I, 1572

In September 1506, Pêro de Anaia constructed a fort at Sofala, later in December, it was besieged by the inhabitants. Both Pêro de Anaia and the Sheikh of Sofala died, and he was temporarily replaced by Manuel Fernandes.

=== Sack of Angoche (1506) ===
In 1506, Tristão da Cunha and his fleet arrived in Malindi. The sultan of Malindi faced pressure from the rulers of Angoche and Mombasa. These local rulers were making life difficult for the sultan, prompting him to seek assistance from the Portuguese. In response, Tristão da Cunha, commanding a Portuguese fleet, was tasked with providing military support and securing Portuguese interests along the East African coast. Before heading to Angoche, Afonso de Albuquerque informed the sultan of his upcoming plans to conquer Hormuz and other towns along the Arabian Sea, requesting pilots familiar with the coast.

With the sultan's blessing and a contingent of skilled pilots, the Portuguese fleet sailed to Angoche to enforce order. The Portuguese arrived and attacked without delay, sacking and burning the town. The town fell easily, and the fleet carried out their campaign in Barawa.

=== Sack of Oja & Lamu (1507) ===
In February 1507, a fleet of 16 ships commanded by Tristão da Cunha and assisted by Afonso de Albuquerque docked at Malindi. The King of Malindi, a faithful Portuguese vassal, requested assistance from the Portuguese against the hostile cities of Oja (Note: Or "Hoja", now known as Ungwana, located on the Tana River in Kenya.), Lamu and Barawa. Oja was sacked and Lamu was subjugated without a fight.

=== Battle of Barawa (1507) ===
Upon reaching Barawa, in April, the Portuguese first sent an ambassador, who offered the city the chance to submit without a fight, which was refused. The Portuguese made ready to assault the city, and reported that its defences included a well fortified wall and a garrison of 4,000 men ready to fight.

The following morning, Tristão da Cunha and Afonso de Albuquerque led two assault groups. Of those 4,000 men, 2,000 sallied forth to fight the Portuguese on the beach, but were driven back to the city. Immediately the Portuguese surrounded the city. The Portuguese scaled the wall at a weak point, after a sudden attack, discovered by Afonso de Albuquerque and the defenses were breached. Many inhabitants fled, but those who remained perished in the fight. The city was then sacked and put to the torch, while the survivors watched from afar. Afterwards the Portuguese proceeded to Mogadishu and attacked Pate and Socotra.

=== Raid of Mafia, Zanzibar and Pemba (1509) ===
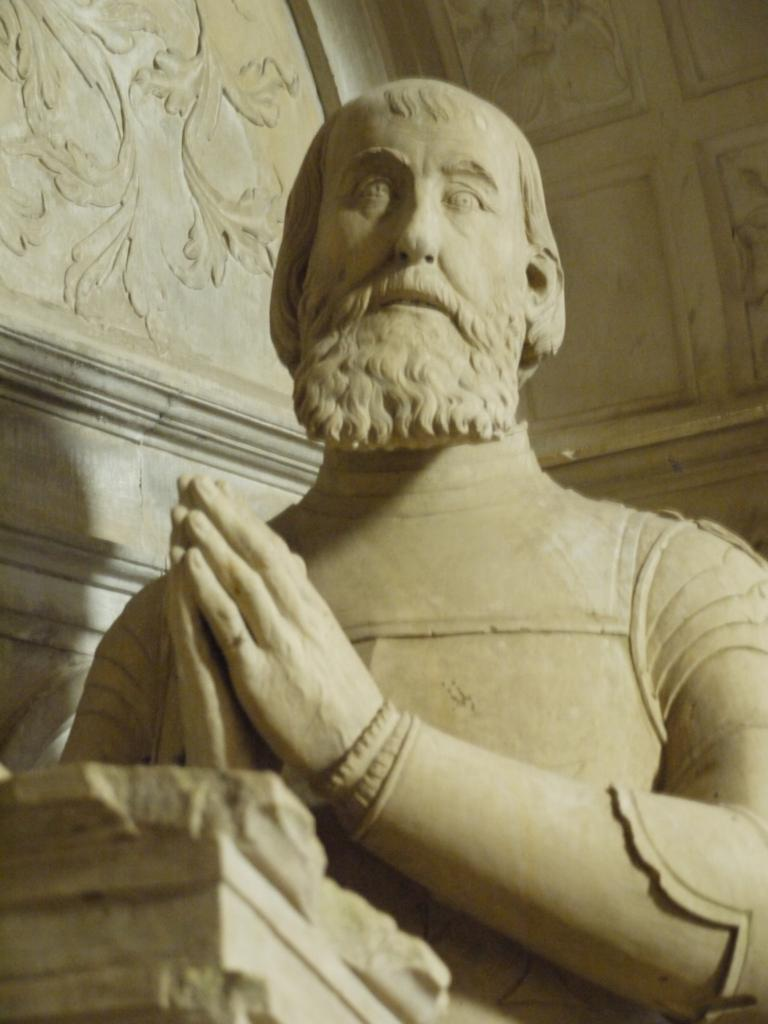
Statue of Duarte de Lemos in Trofa, Portugal, 16th century

In 1509, Mafia, Zanzibar, Pemba and other islands were raided and forced to pay tribute by a fleet commanded by Duarte de Lemos.

== Aftermath ==
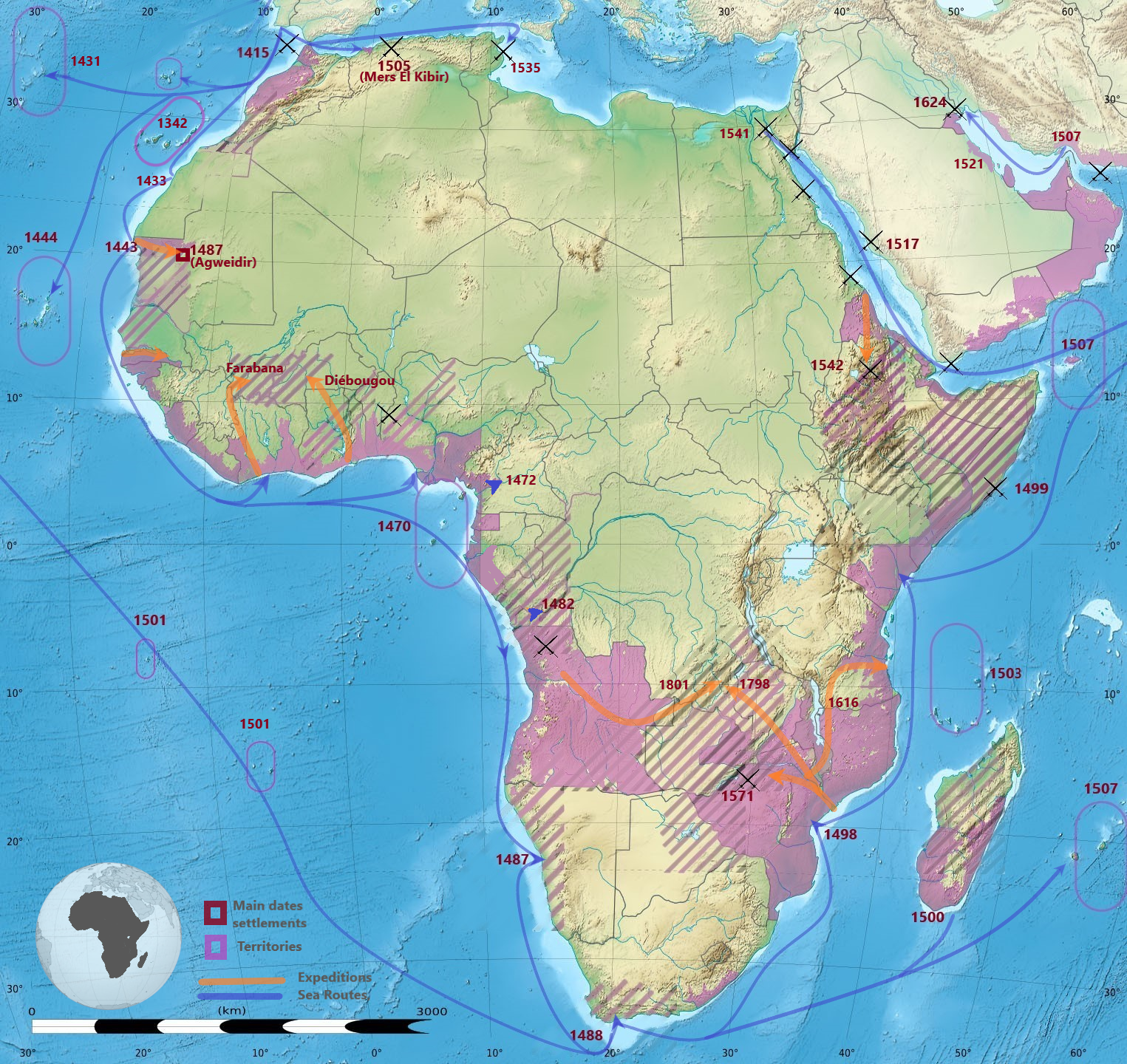
Map of the Portuguese Empire showing its extent along the East African coast

In less than a decade, the Portuguese had established their supremacy along the East African coast, and by 1509, all of the East African coast had fallen under Portuguese rule. Around this time, the Portuguese achieved a major victory at the Battle of Diu, against a combined Mamluk-Gujarati-Zamorin fleet, effectively disabling any significant resistance. As a result, the Portuguese secured dominance over the Indian Ocean.

Over time, Swahili trading centers went out of business, and trade between Africa and Asia on the Indian Ocean eventually collapsed.

== Bibliography ==
- Monteiro, Saturnino (1989). Batalhas e combates da Marinha Portuguesa: 1139-1521 (in Portuguese). pp. 101–103.
- Bennett, Norman R. (November 10, 2016). A History of the Arab State of Zanzibar. Routledge. ISBN 9781315411156.
- Sanceau, Elaine (1936). Indies adventure; the amazing career of Afonso de Albuquerque, captain-general and governor of India (1509-1515). London Glasgow : Blackie & son.
- Pearson, Michael N. (October 14, 2002). Port Cities and Intruders The Swahili Coast, India, and Portugal in the Early Modern Era. Johns Hopkins University Press. ISBN 9780801870286.
- Osório, Jerónimo (1752) [1571]. The History of the Portuguese, During the Reign of Emmanuel. London: Printed for A. Millar.
- Low, Charles Rathbone (1881). Maritime Discovery: A History of Nautical Discovery from the Earliest Times. London: Newman and Co.
- Subrahmanyam, Sanjay (1997). The Career and Legend of Vasco Da Gama. Cambridge University Press. ISBN 9780521646291.
- Were, Gideon S. (1971). East Africa through a thousand years; a history of the years A.D. 1000 to the present day. New York, Africana Pub. Corp.
