= Fernão Gomes de Lemos =

Captain of Portuguese Ceylon

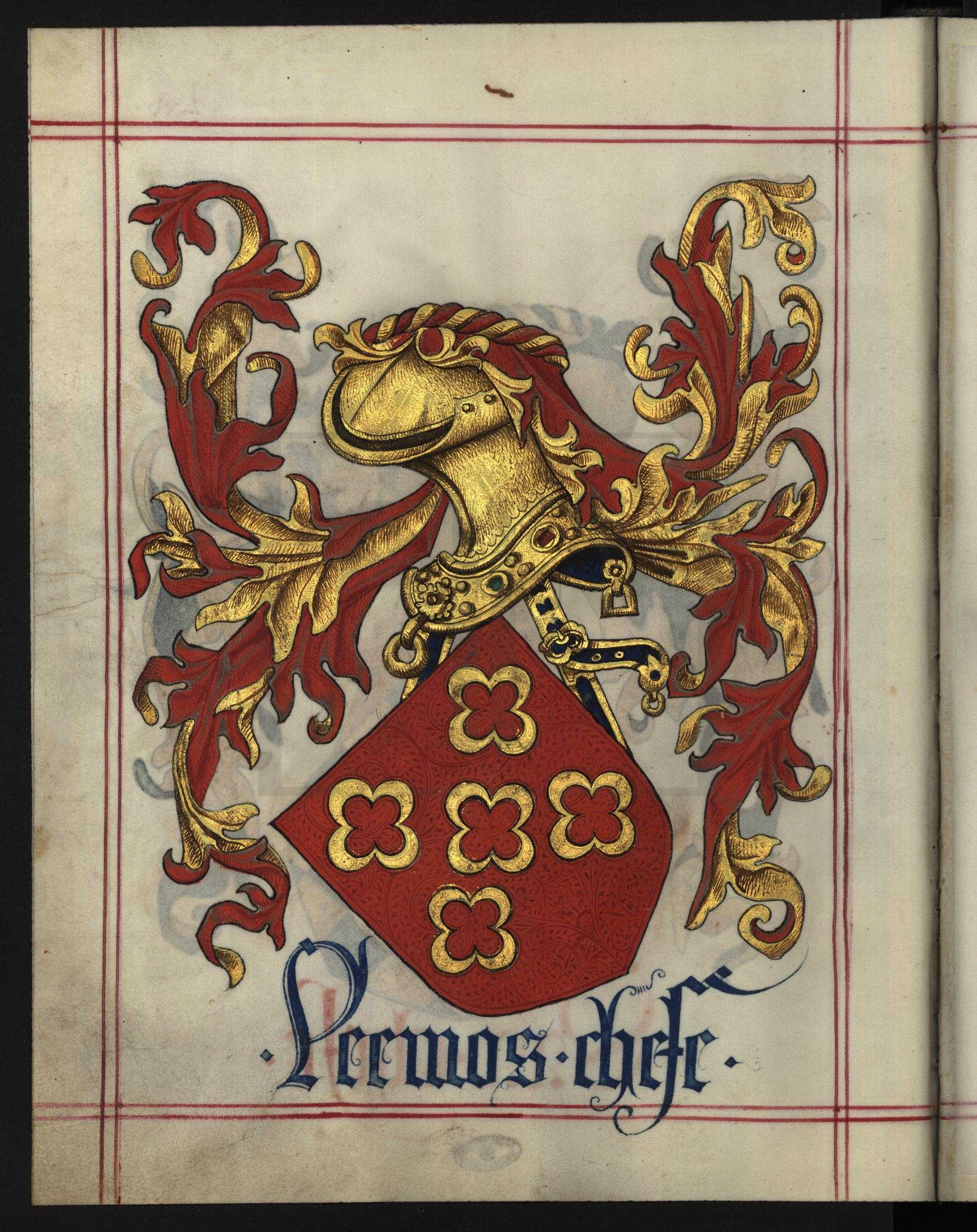
- Coat of Arms of the Lemos family, Lords of Trofa

3rd Captain of Portuguese Ceylon

1st Portuguese Ambassador to Persia
- In office 1522–1524
- Monarch: John III of Portugal
- Preceded by: Lopo de Brito
- Succeeded by: Office vacant

Personal details
- Born: c. 1485 Portugal
- Died: c. 1535 Estado da India
- Citizenship: Portugal
- Occupation: Soldier, Politician, Diplomat

Military service
- Battles/wars: Sinhalese–Portuguese conflicts

Fernão Gomes de Lemos (c. 1485 - c. 1535) was the third and last Captain of Portuguese Ceylon. Lemos succeeded Lopo de Brito and was appointed in 1522 under John III of Portugal, he was Captain until 1524. In 1524 when he left as Captain, the office was left vacant until 1551, where the office was succeeded by Captain-majors of Portuguese Ceylon. He was also Portuguese Ambassador to Persia, appointed by Afonso de Albuquerque in 1515.

== Biography ==
He was the second-born son of João Gomes de Lemos, 2nd Lord of Trofa, by his wife, Violante de Sequeira.

He was probably born around 1485, a couple of years after his elder brother, Duarte de Lemos.

He went to India, with his elder brother - the aforementioned Duarte de Lemos, later 3rd Lord of Trofa - in the armada that left Lisbon in 1508. He then took part in the capture of Malacca (1511) and Hormuz (1515) by the Portuguese under Afonso de Albuquerque. He was also present in the botched siege of Aden, in 1513.

=== Envoy to Persia ===
In 1515, Albuquerque sent him as envoy to the court of Shah Ismail I of Persia. He brought with him munitions and war-materials, intended to help the Shah in his wars against the Ottoman ruler, Selim I.

From there Lemos wrote several letters to King Manuel I of Portugal; in one of these letters, dated January 4, 1517, he recalled that when Afonso de Albuquerque appointed him as Ambassador, the mission was "a difficult service because not even the path to that country [Persia] was well known".

Albuquerque's decision to appoint an Ambassador to the Safavid court was a necessity mandated by the geographical proximity of Hormuz - that had just been conquered by the Portuguese - to Persia and by the traditional role of Persia as a near Suzerain of Hormuz.

The diplomatic contacts maintained by Fernão Gomes de Lemos with the Safavid Shah were publicly cordial, but in private the Persian sovereign expressed his annoyance with the Portuguese occupation of Hormuz. The counterproposals made by Ambassador Lemos - including Portuguese military support, in the event of a conflict between Persia and her rival, the Mamluk Sultanate - managed, however, to set Luso-Persian relations on a relatively sound footing.

Fernão de Lemos also reported candidly on the customs and behaviours he found at the Shah' court, including public consumption of alcohol, which he found unexpected in a Muslim society.

=== Captain of Portuguese Ceylon ===
Lemos was the 3rd and last Captain of Portuguese Ceylon, from 1522 to 1524, based in Colombo.

Shortly after taking office, in early 1523, he wrote to King João III. In this letter, Lemos expressed the opinion that it would be useless and even counterproductive to maintain the Portuguese fortress in Colombo (built during the tenure of his predecessor), as it was causing a strong reaction of opposition among the Sinhalese "who saw oppression [in the existence] of that fortress". Thus, given the "little fruit that could be drawn from the Portuguese military garrison" and the fact that there were "no greater Portuguese ambitions at stake" and that in any case [there would be] "very serious difficulties in achieving them", Lemos concluded that "for the purpose of vassalage and trade, it was enough to have a Feitoria; and everything else would serve as an impediment to the expansion of the [Portuguese] State by other means".

The governor in Goa, Dom Duarte de Meneses, agreed with Lemos' opinion, and reinforced it by stating that in Ceylon only the cinnamon trade was important, everything else being "of little interest".

The Portuguese crown, taking into account the opinions of Captain Lemos in Colombo and Governor Meneses in Goa, sent instructions through the new viceroy, the Admiral Dom Vasco da Gama, that ordered the dismantling of the fortress, leaving in Colombo only a Portuguese factory. This had been a decision already considered by King Manuel I, and now implemented by his successor João III.

Fernão Gomes de Lemos, in compliance with the royal instructions, thus destroyed the fortress and returned with the Portuguese garrison and artillery to Goa, on the ship of Captain General António de Lemos, his brother. In Colombo, only the head of the factory and alcaide, Nuno Freire de Andrade, would remain, with 20 soldiers; The viceroy Vasco da Gama, in Goa, wrote in the meantime to the King of Kotte, Bhuvanekabãhu VII, informing him of the decision to destroy the fortress and to keep only a feitoria in Colombo, explaining that "the fortress was a cause of trouble; to satisfy Your Highness I thus order it destroyed and I only leave there a Factor to collect the tributes and trade in spices useful to the kingdom [of Portugal]".

Fernão Gomes de Lemos still had the time to formally introduce the new factor and his scrivener to King Bhuvanekabãhu VII, who welcomed them with goodwill, promising them his support; only after performing this last diplomatic démarche did Lemos leave Colombo to sail back to the Malabar coast.

He returned to Portugal in the late 1520s, and bought an estate in Alenquer on August 3, 1529, for the sum of 850,000 reais.

=== Death "in the service of the king" ===
He is one of the four brothers of the above-mentioned António de Lemos - the youngest son of the 2nd Lords of Trofa - whom the governor of Portuguese India, Martim Afonso de Sousa, writing to King John III from Goa, on December 1, 1543, mentions as having " died in the service of the King".

Thus, given the date of his purchase of an estate in Portugal and the date and contents of the letter of Martim Afonso de Sousa, it is likely that Lemos died in the Estado da India - and probably in combat - sometime during the 1530s.

He never married, but had an illegitimate daughter, Filipa de Lemos, to whom he left 40,000 reais for her marriage, in his will.

Government offices
Preceded by Lopo de Brito	Captain of Portuguese Ceylon; 1522–1524	Succeeded by Office vacant
