= Church of São Salvador (Trofa) =

- Parochial Church of Trofa
- Igreja de São Salvador
- Church of São Salvador
- 40°36′39.1″N 8°28′42.8″W
- Location: Aveiro, Baixo Vouga, Centro
- Country: Portugal

Architecture
- Architect: Diogo de Castilho
- Style: Gothic, Renaissance, Mannerism

The Church of São Salvador (Portuguese: Capela e Panteão dos Lemos/Igreja Paroquial de Trofa/Igreja de São Salvador) is a church in the civil parish of Trofa, Segadães e Lamas do Vouga, in the municipality of Águeda, in the Portuguese Centro district of Aveiro.

== History ==
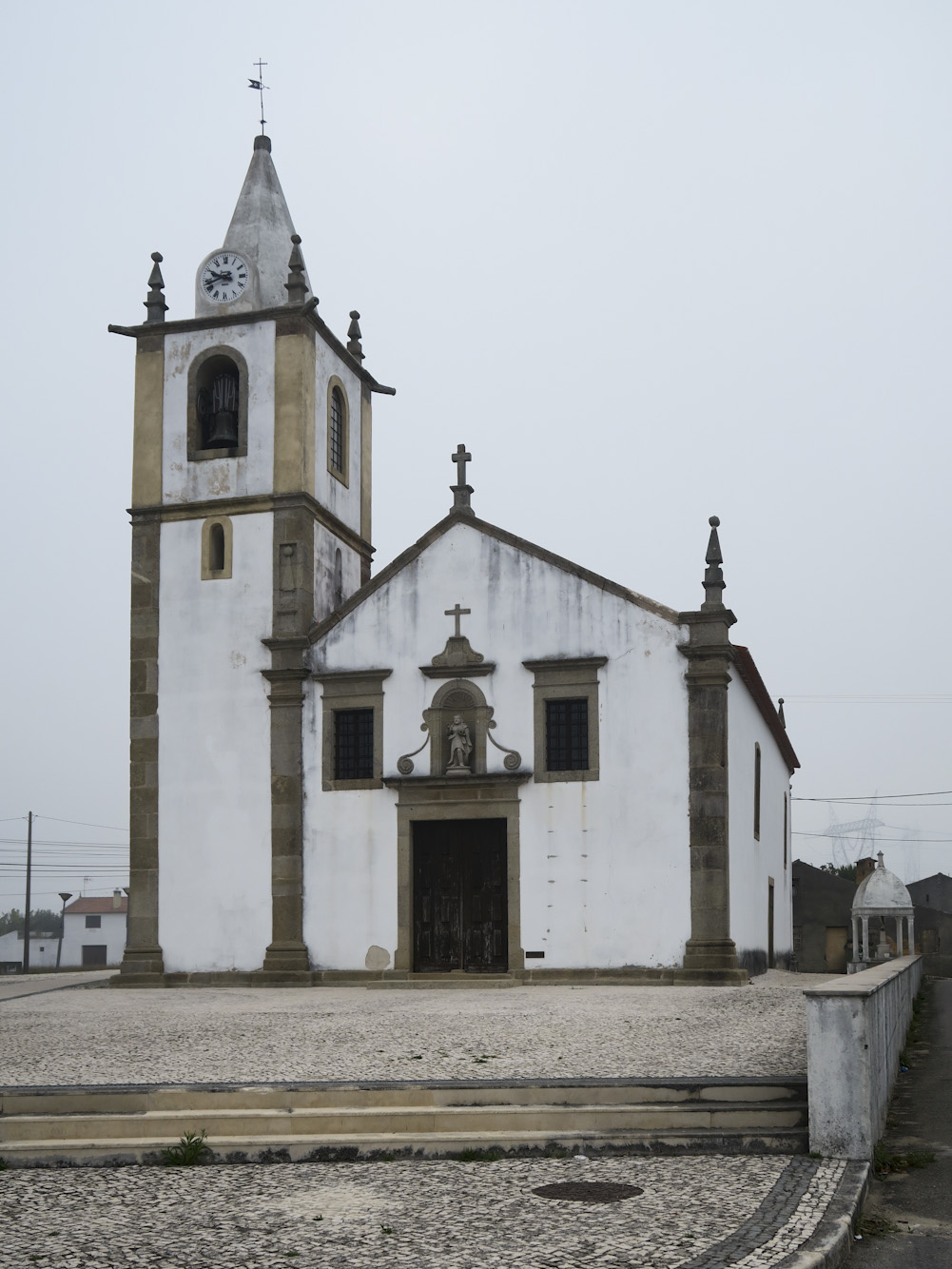
A view of the parochial church of São Salvador

In 1499, King D. Afonso V made Gomes Martins de Lemos the 1st Lord of Trofa. In 1522, his grandson Duarte de Lemos, 3rd Lord of Trofa, ordered the construction of a funerary chapel in the parish of Trofa.

Between 1536 and 1539, the parietal tombs and statuary were constructed.

Between the 18th and 19th century the main body of the church was constructed.

In 1978, one of the legs of the "praying" statue was encountered broken.

On 1 June 1992, the property fell under the authority of the IPPARInstituto Português do Património Arquitetónico (Portuguese Institute for Architectural Patrimony), by decree 106F/92 (Diário da República, Série 1A, 126).

A conditional approval was obtained on 16 November 1998, from the civil parish authority of Trofa and municipality of Águeda, to expand and redefine the size of the churchyard.

In 2006, the parochial church of Trofa do Vouga was closed to the public since August, in order to precede with work to conserve, restore and promote the religious heritage; work began on 17 August 2006, then concluded in April 2007.

== Architecture ==
The church is located in the town of Trofa, in a small, isolated churchyard slightly arborized and enclosed by wall, separating it from agricultural lands.

The plan of the church includes a long nave, with laterally-addorsed rectangular bell tower and sacristy, and covered in ceiling tile. The simple facade includes a portico crowned by niche, that includes statue and surmounted by simple cross, that two lateral friezes and a frontispiece, with corners in stones. The rectangular belltower, two-registers high, is topped by a conical ceiling, and includes a clock. The church is illuminated through windows located laterally along the nave and from the high choir.

=== Interior ===
The interior, comprised a unique nave with vaulted ceiling, with five framed sections that includes plastered decoration, and extends to architrave. Above two columns is high-choir in wood with balustrade, with a common access that provides access to the bell-tower. There are also two lateral doorways, a wood pulpit and two collateral retables with architrave decorated in wood.

The main chapel shelters four arcosolia linked by two structures that uniquely divided by two arches, covering three urns and ornate state.

The two tombs (to the left) are decorated with three medallions and busts, above arches with four columns and archivolts. The entablature of the two tombs are covered individually-decorated, triangular caps, with central medallion. Above these structures are two large windows, with semi-circular decoration in the interior.

The front of the retable consists of a two-register gilded wood structure with paintings under a central arch, that includes columns, statuary and three sections with semi-circular decoration. The design, which is sectional, is decorated with sculpted forms, that include heraldic symbols, vegetation, anthropomorphic, mythological and military forms.

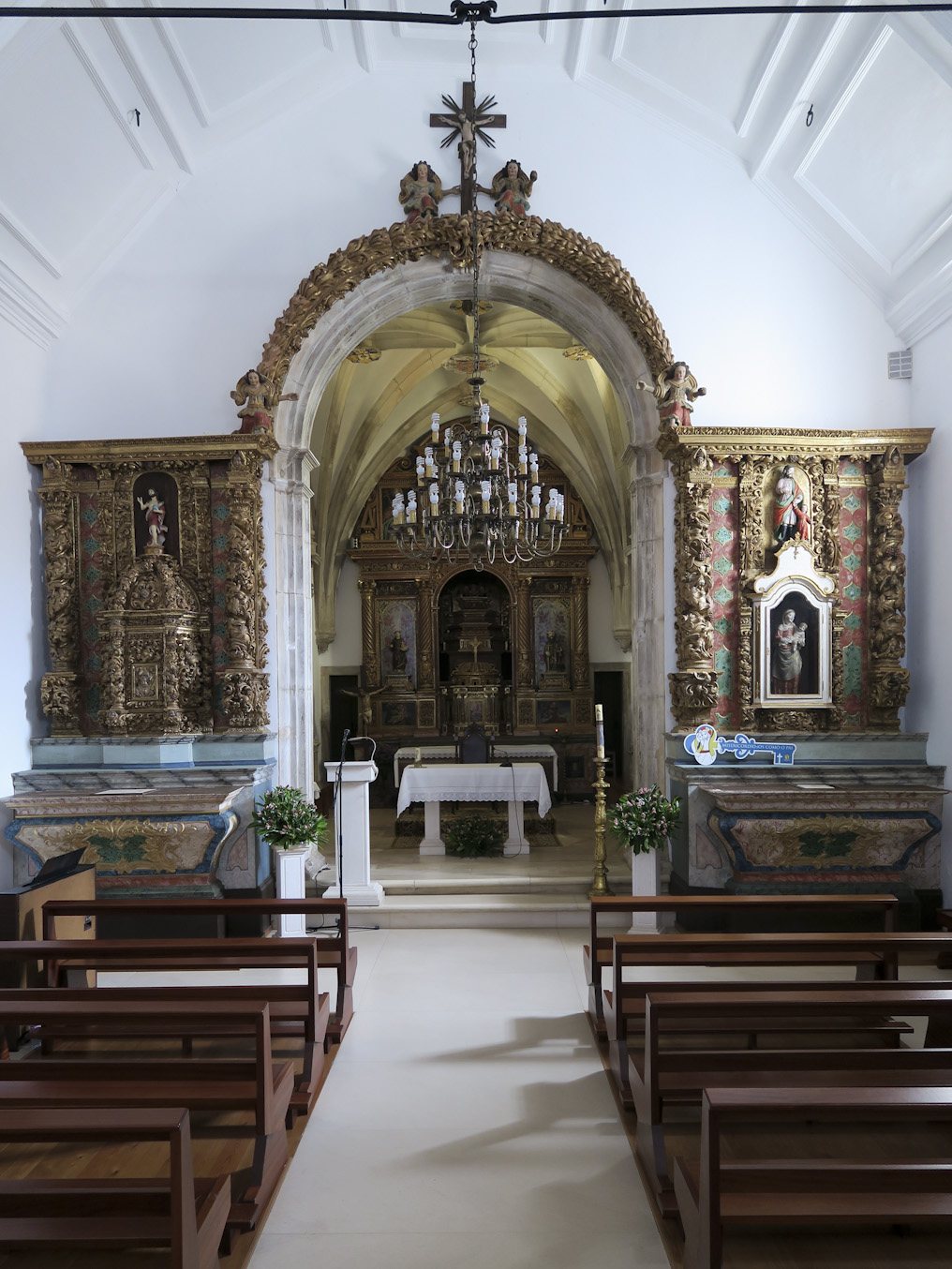

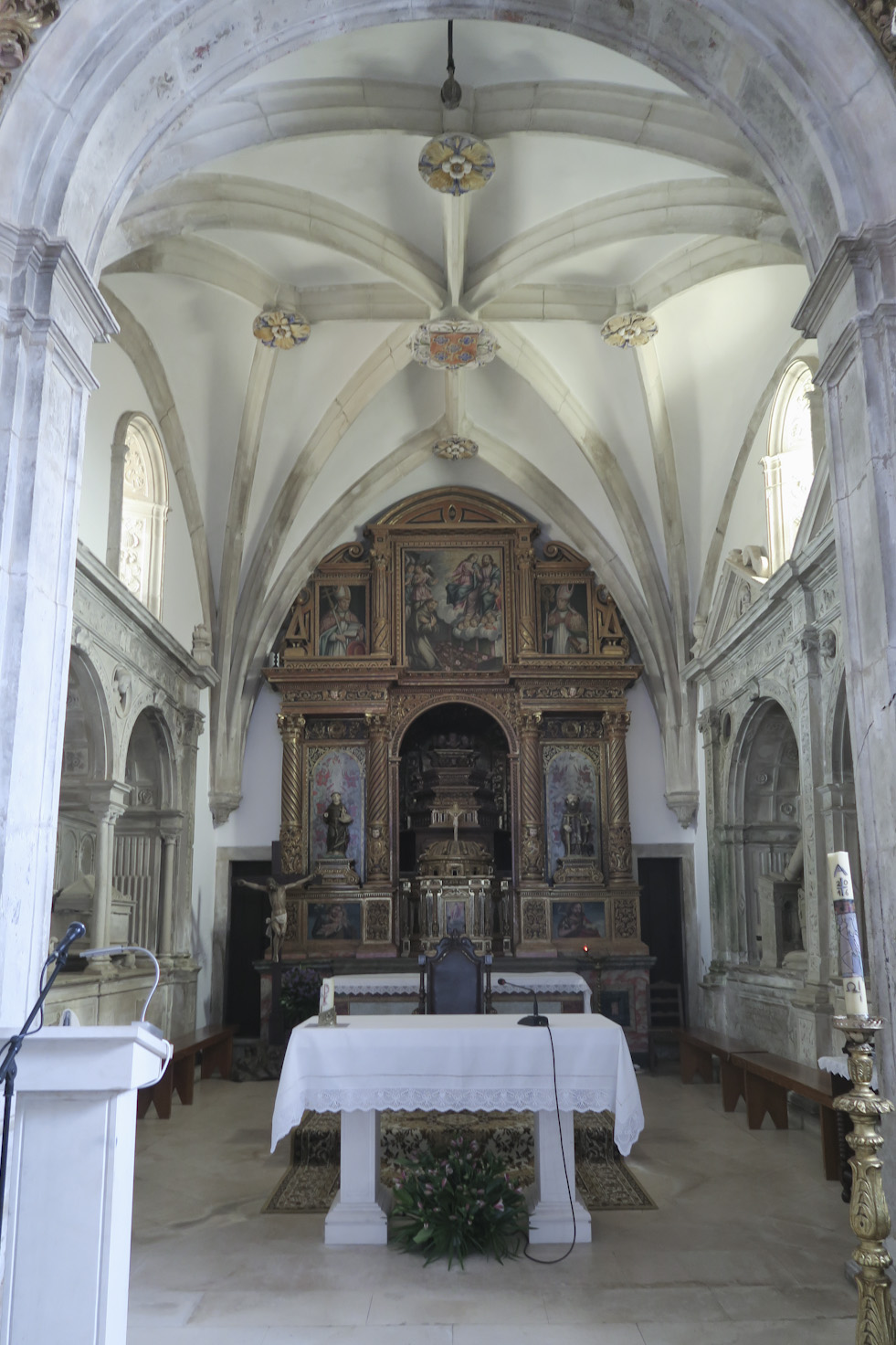

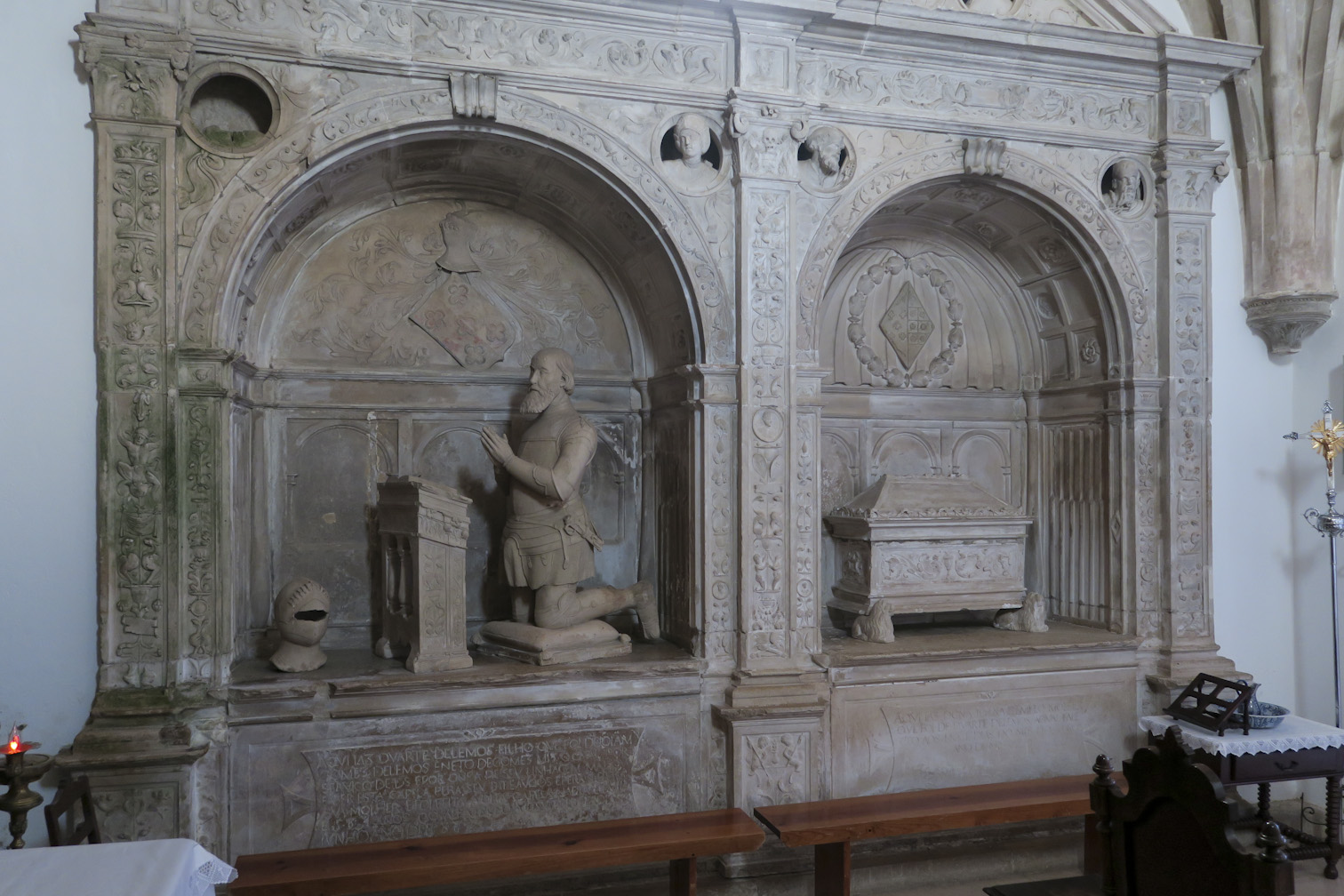

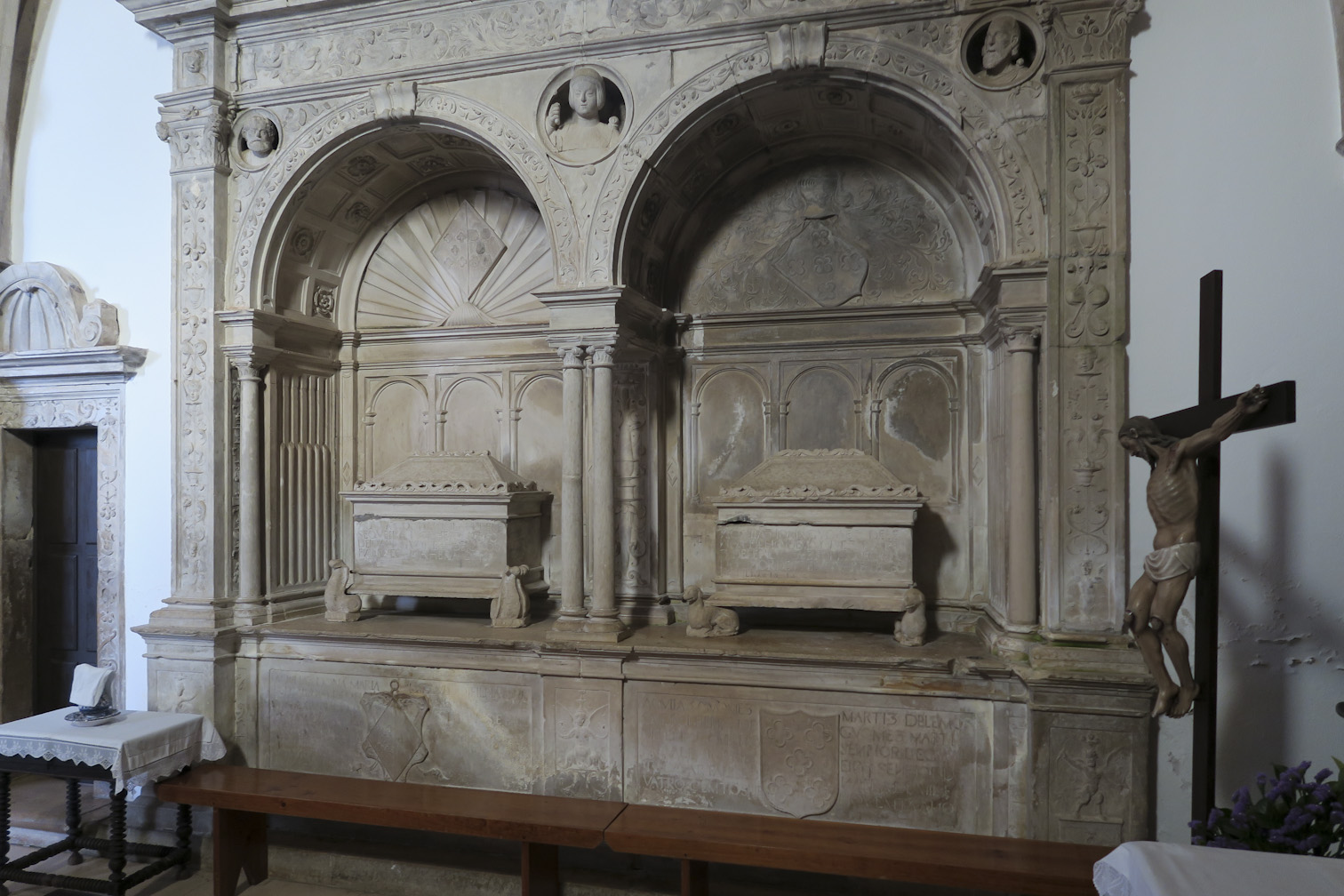
