= List of captains of Portuguese Ceylon =

The Portuguese arrived in the Kingdom of Kotte in 1505. By 1518, they had appointed a captain to control the Portuguese-occupied territory called Ceylon on the island of modern-day Sri Lanka. In that time, there were numerous captains until 1551. The post of captain was succeeded by that of the captain-majors in 1551 and by the governor in 1594.

== List of captains ==
Portrait	Name	Birth	Death	Captain from	Captain until	Sovereign
	João da Silveira	-	-	1518	1518	Manuel I
	Lopo de Brito	-	-	1518	1522	Manuel I John III
	Fernão Gomes de Lemos	-	-	1522	1524	John III
	Vacant	-	-	1524	1551	John III

== See also ==
- List of monarchs of Sri Lanka
- List of captain-majors of Portuguese Ceylon
- List of captain-generals of Portuguese Ceylon
- History of Sri Lanka
