= Archaeological site of Cabeço do Vouga =

Archeological site of Cabeço do Vouga
- Civitas Marnele, Castelli Marnelis, or Castro Marnel
- Interactive map of Archeological site of Cabeço do Vouga
- 40°37′42″N 8°28′01″W
- Type: Archeological site
- Location: Baixo Vouga, Centro, Portugal

Site notes
- Archaeologists: unknown
- Public access: Private

The Archaeological site of Cabeço do Vouga (Portuguese: Estação arqueológica do Cabeço do Vouga), also known as civitas, castelli or castro Marnel, is an archaeological site in civil parish union of Trofa, Segadães e Lamas do Vouga, in the municipality of Águeda, in central Portugal. It is classified as a Public Interest Heritage Site (Portuguese: Imóvel de Interesse Público), and dates back to the Iron Age.

== History ==
The site dates to the 1st century, and consists of a wall platform, that was later reoccupied by Romans. The Roman presence along the physical frontiers was a systematic implantation of their politico-administrative power in the Iberian peninsula, involving the occupation and reorganization of their territorial conquests, over a vast area. This specifically included the definition of administrative regions, the demarcation of routes that secured connections between their occupied population centers and their actions based on the changing policies of Rome. The first of these was accomplished, essentially, by the territorial definition of their civitates, the normal unit of Roman administration, which subordinated other rural sites to its political, administrative and judicial authority and imposed control.

In this context, the development of Talabriga, one of the capitals of the three main civitates that divided the territory of Scallabis Eurobrittium north of the Mondego river, was important in the daily activities of the site known as Cabeço do Vouga, situated in Vouga, a small village that has been an important town. Situated on a hilltop overlooking the River Mondego, it falls along an axis that connected Olisipo and Bracara Augusta, evident from its dominion over the landscape.

The settlement was likely conquered by Celt forces sometime in 137 A.D., who reinforced the defensive system. Barbarian invaders, likely Vandalas, reconquered the site later, and sometime between the 3rd-4th century A.D., the walls were extended with counter-walls.

Partially excavated in the second quarter of the 20th century, by António Gomes da Rocha Madahil (an archaeological enthusiast and historian of Ílhavo) and Sousa Baptista, the station was successively excavated in the early part of the 21st century. In the second half of the 20th century, Mário de Castro Hipólito completed work on site, followed in 1996 by a new intervention, under the direction of Fernando A. Pereira da Silva (from the University of Porto).

In 1999, a cooperation protocol was signed by the municipal council and the Escola Superior de Conservacion e Restauracion de Bens Culturais de Galicia (Galician Superior School of Cultural Conservation and Restoration) to treat and restore the site, that included geophysical surveys of the site. These excavations were begun in July 1999, resulting in the discovery of further structures.

== Architecture ==
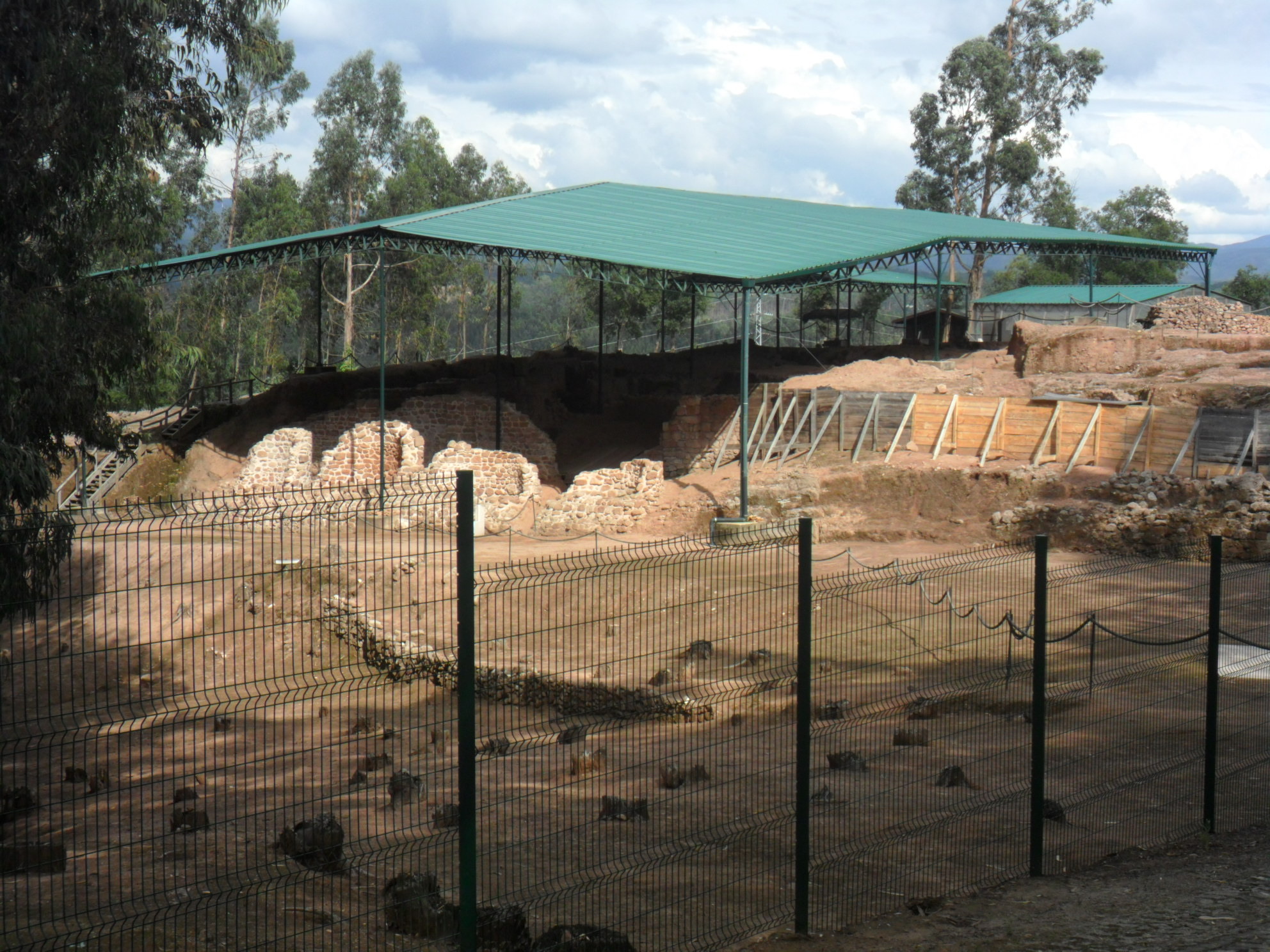
The archeological station of Cabeço do Vouga, between the hilltops of Cabeço Redondo and Cabeço da Mina

The site is situated in a rural landscape, located between the hilltops of Cabeço Redondo and Cabeço da Mina, extending along a great expanse covered by forest and wild brush. Nearby are two chapels erected during the Christian period, dedicated to the Holy Spirit (Portuguese: Divino Espírito Santo) and Our Lady of Victory (Portuguese: Nossa Senhora da Vitória).

The platform is an artificial construction, walled in a rectangular plan, from limited excavations. The more relevant walls are 3.3 metres (11 ft) high, 41 metres (135 ft) long and 0.60 metres (2.0 ft) wide. On the eastern end, there is evidence of reinforcement, with a rectangular counter-wall, of dual pilasters, that includes four circular buildings.

The fortified site was constructed sometime in the region's Iron Age (confirmed from the circular pattern of its construction), and was reused during the Roman period, as part of their geostrategic policy of reusing pre-existing local sites. Investigations of the site permit a distinction of the complex defensive systems, formed by lines of walls and interior rectangular structures covering 4 hectares. The Roman presence is represented by characteristic materials used in its reconstruction, including ceramics and amphorae.

From 2010 onwards, the Águeda municipality abandoned the site.

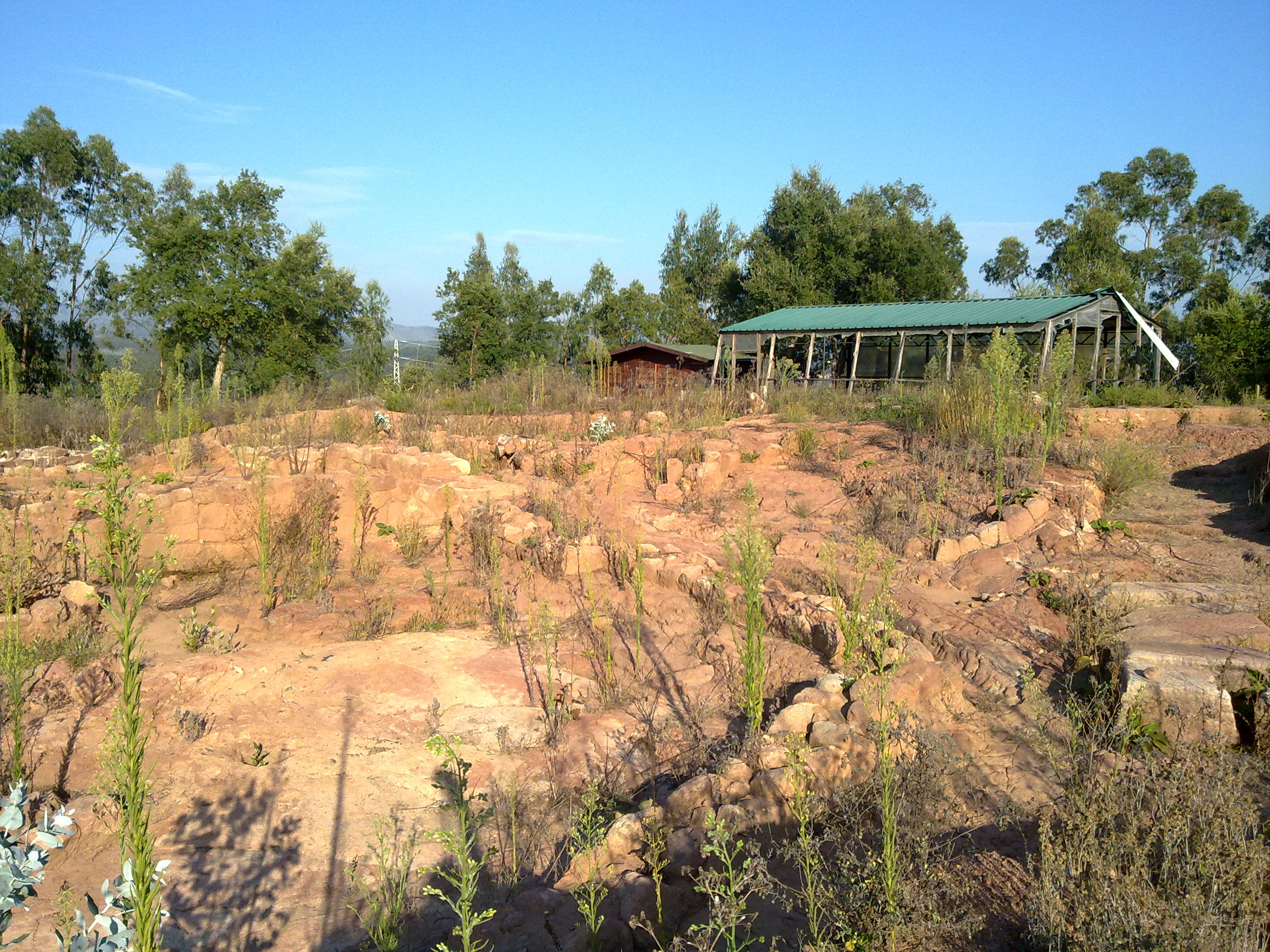
Abandoned Marnel castle ruins at Cabeço de Vouga, in 2014
