= Lopo de Brito =

Captain of Portuguese Ceylon (c.1480–c.1547)

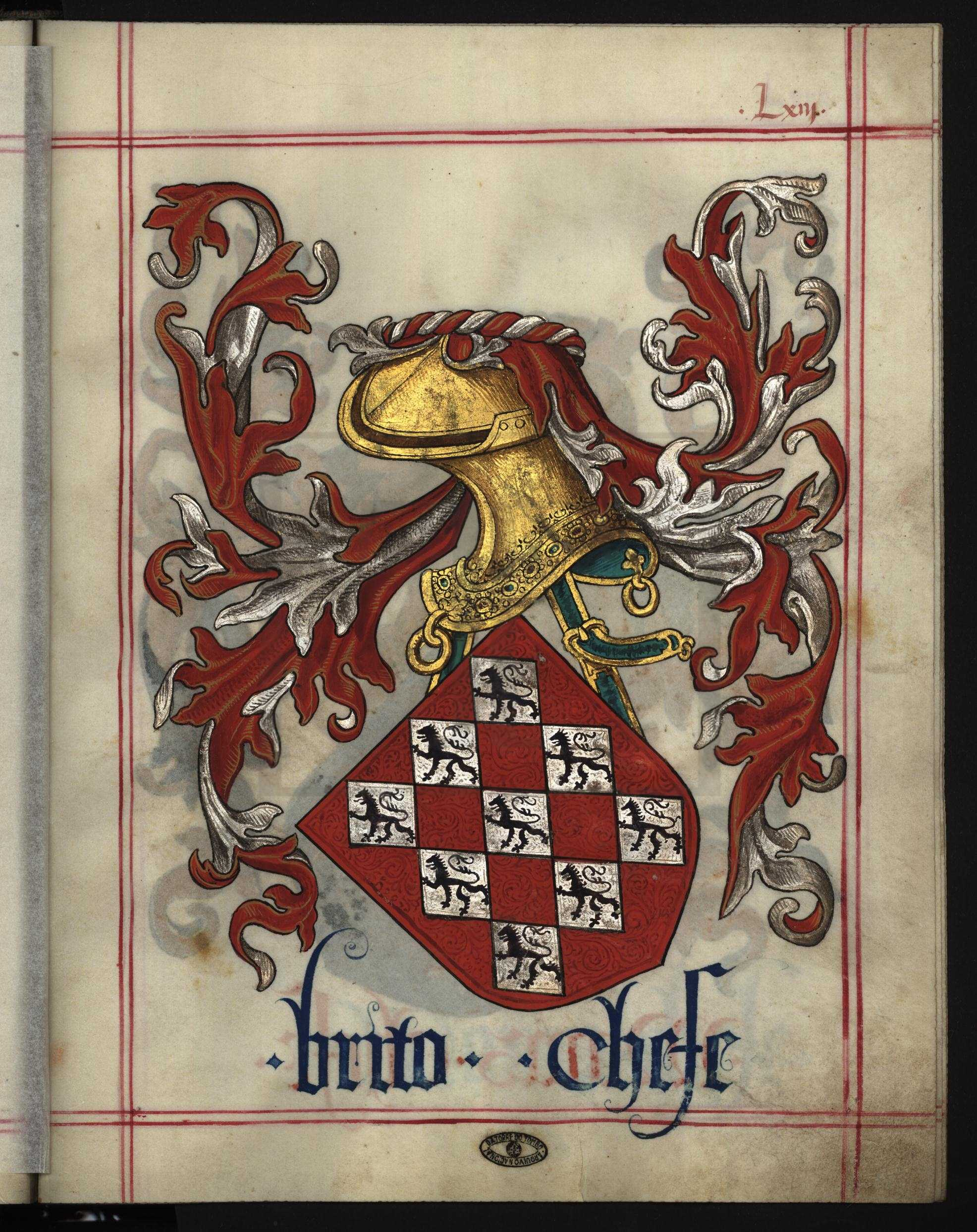
- Coat of Arms of the Brito family, Lords of the Estates of São Lourenço in Lisbon and Santo Estevão in Beja

2nd Captain of Portuguese Ceylon
- In office 1518–1522
- Monarchs: Manuel I of Portugal; John III of Portugal
- Preceded by: João da Silveira
- Succeeded by: Fernão Gomes de Lemos

Personal details
- Born: c. 1480
- Died: c. 1547
- Citizenship: Portuguese
- Spouse(s): Isabel de Brito, Iria de Brito
- Relations: Jorge de Brito, captain of the Moluccas (brother)
- Children: João de Brito, Cristóvão de Brito
- Occupation: Soldier, Politician

Military service
- Battles/wars: Sinhalese–Portuguese conflicts

Lopo de Brito was the second Captain of Portuguese Ceylon. Brito succeeded João da Silveira and was appointed in 1518 under Manuel I of Portugal, he was Captain until 1522. He was succeeded by Fernão Gomes de Lemos.

== Biography ==
He was the second-born son of João de Brito Nogueira, Nobleman of the Royal House and member of the Council of King Manuel I on April 16, 1514, by his wife Dona Brites de Lima, daughter of the 4th Senhor (Lord) of Regalados; and nephew of Luís de Brito Nogueira, Lord of the Estates of São Lourenço in Lisbon and Santo Estevão in Beja.

He arrived in Portuguese Ceylon around September 1518, sent by the new governor of the Estado da Índia, Diogo Lopes de Sequeira, with the mission - ordered by King Manuel I - to build a stone fortress in Colombo. He was accompanied by his brother, António de Brito, appointed as Alcaide (castellan) of the fortress, and 400 soldiers, masons and carpenters.

(António de Brito, accompanied by another brother called Jorge de Brito, would later distinguished himself as captain and governor of the Maluku Islands, where he ordered the construction of Fort Kastela, also known as Fort of São João Batista de Ternate).

The construction of the fortress of Colombo had to be carried out in extremely difficult conditions, subject to constant attacks and siege by the military forces of the Kingdom of Kotte, under the orders of its sovereign, Vijayabahu VI. Lopo de Brito resorted to counterattacks to relieve the pressure from the besiegers, namely on June 15, 1519, when he managed, albeit provisionally, to disperse Kotte's forces.

On May 7, 1520, the King of Kotte ordered the total siege of the fortress, with thousands of soldiers, supported by artillery. The siege would last 5 months, and prevented the supply of water and food to the Portuguese. Lopo de Brito asked for help to the governor in Goa, who at the time was absent on an expedition to the Persian Gulf; however, the governor's substitute, Dom Aleixo de Meneses, managed to send relief from Cochin, on 25 August, in a galley commanded by António de Lemos (brother of Fernão Gomes de Lemos, who would later succeed Brito in Colombo) with 50 men-at-arms. Despite the small size of this contingent, which only reached Colombo on 4 October, it could be used for a joint counterattack with Lopo de Brito's forces, causing Kotte's troops to flee. Following this action, Brito managed to negotiate a truce agreement with the King of Kotte, in which he agreed to resume the tribute, that had for years been interrupted, that his father had promised to pay to the King of Portugal.

The peace agreement was seen as a defeat at the court of Kotte, contributing to weakening the King's position and generating a plot that would lead to his assassination in 1521, in the so-called Vijayabā Kollaya (The Sack of Vijayabahu). Subsequently, the three sons of the King divided the Kingdom of Kotte among themselves. The internal upheavals that accompanied this division eased the pressure on the Portuguese in Colombo. Lopo de Brito was thus able to complete the construction of the fortress, "a small square, in a triangular shape, and of so much resistance that it was enough to counter the Sinhalese batteries and to repress the strength of the elephants".

In 1522, Lopo de Brito handed over the Colombo Fortress, "which he had defended so valiantly", to Fernão Gomes de Lemos.

On his return to Portugal, he became a member of the Council of king John III. He founded an entailed estate in 1547, that would eventually be inherited by his descendants, the lords of the honra de Barbosa.

== Marriage and children ==
He married twice.

His first wife was his cousin Isabel de Brito, daughter of Estevão de Brito, Lord of the Estate of Santo Estevão, in Beja; there were no children from this marriage.

His second wife was Iria de Brito, also his cousin, daughter of Manuel Freire de Andrade (from the House of the Lords of Bobadela), and Germineza de Melo; they had the following issue:

- João de Brito, who inherited his parents' estates and married Dona Antónia de Ataíde, sister of Dom Luís de Ataíde, 3rd Count of Atouguia and viceroy of Portuguese India, with issue, namely:
  - Lopo de Brito, who supported the pretender to the Portuguese throne, Dom António, Prior of Crato and died in the Battle of Alcântara (1580);
  - Cristóvão de Brito, who died alongside his brother in the Battle of Alcântara, near Lisbon;
  - Dona Iria de Brito, who married twice. Her first marriage was with Dom Diogo Pereira (1570 - 1595), heir of the House of the Counts of Feira, and they had issue; her second husband was Dom Francisco Manuel de Ataíde, 1st Count of Atalaia, and they also had issue, one son who died at a young age.
- Cristóvão de Brito, who married Dona Maria da Silva; with issue, namely:
  - Lopo de Brito, who eventually came to inherit the estates and properties of his grandfather and namesake.

The latter Lopo de Brito married Dona Maria de Alcáçova Carneiro (of the house of the constables of the Castle of Campo Maior) and they had succession, in the Lords of the Estate of Valbom, which passed through marriage to the Lords of the Honra and Estate of Barbosa (who would also inherit the estate founded in 1559 by the Captain of Ceylon's eldest brother, Cristóvão de Brito, and his wife D. Brites de Ataíde, sister of the 3rd Count of Atouguia) .

Government offices
Preceded by João da Silveira	Captain of Portuguese Ceylon; 1518-1522	Succeeded by Fernão Gomes de Lemos
