= Duarte de Lemos, 3rd Lord of Trofa =

Portuguese colonial administrator (c. 1480–1558)

Duarte de Lemos
- 3rd Lord of Trofa
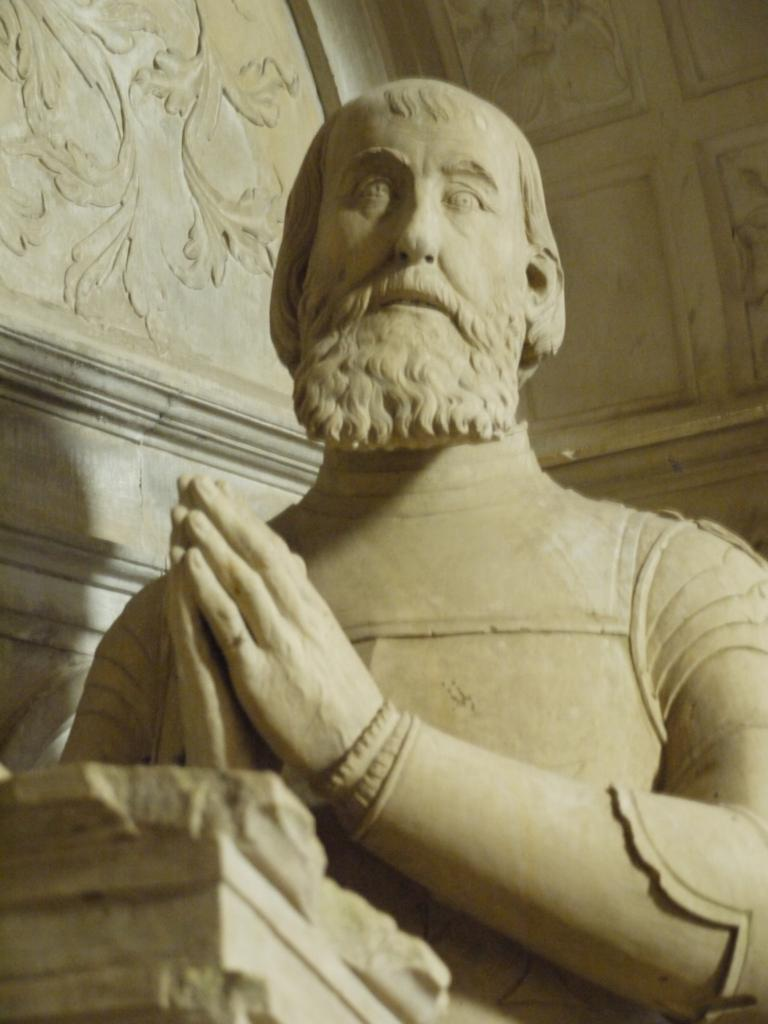
- 16th century Statue of Duarte de Lemos in Trofa, Portugal

Lord of Trofa
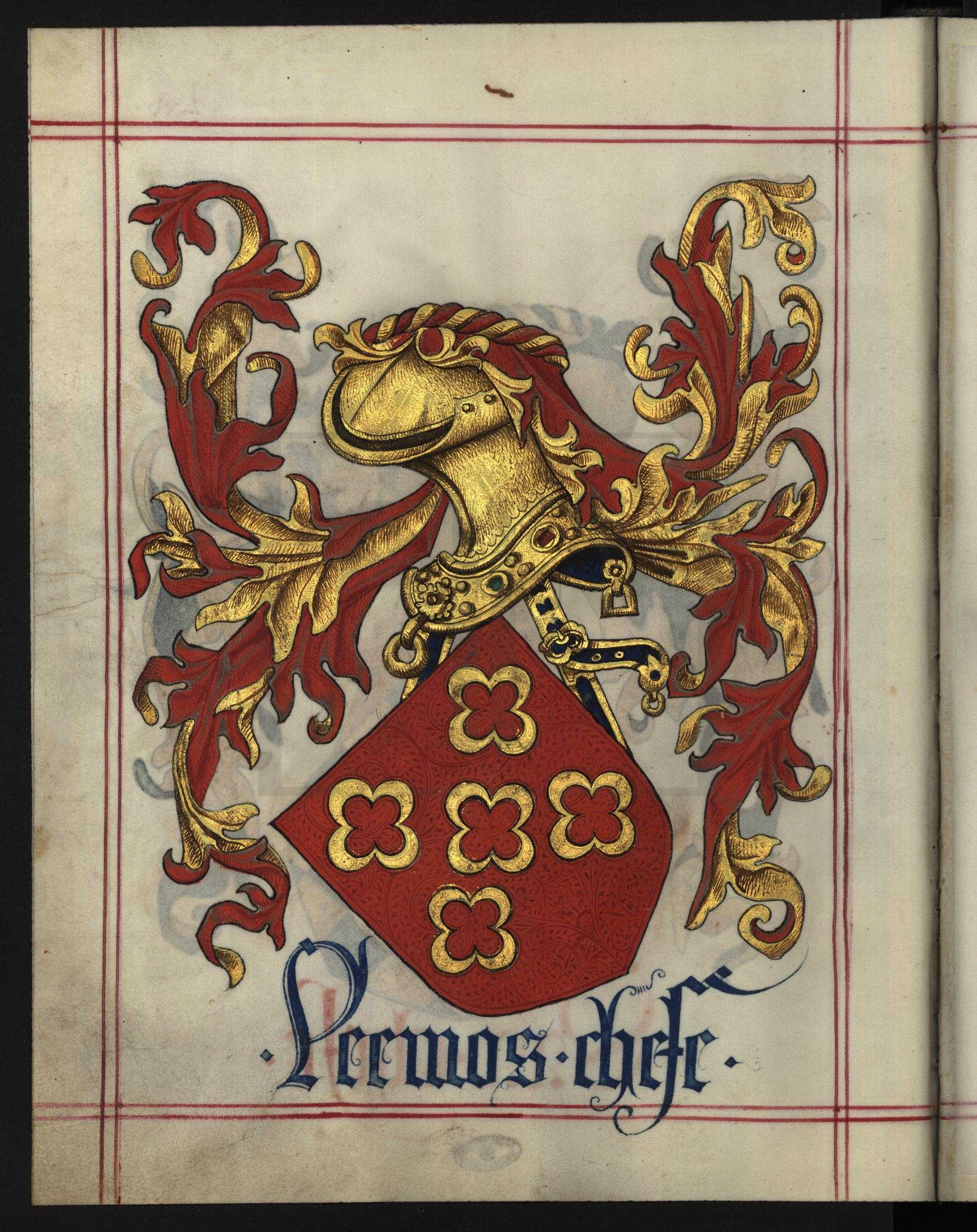
- Coat of arms
- Tenure: 1514-1558
- Predecessor: João Gomes de Lemos, 2nd Lord of Trofa
- Successor: João Gomes de Lemos, 4th Lord of Trofa
- Other titles: Lord of the Island of Santo Antônio (present-day Vitória), Captaincy of Espírito Santo, Brazil
- Born: c. 1480; Kingdom of Portugal
- Died: 1558 (aged 77–78); Kingdom of Portugal
- Spouse: Joana de Melo
- Issue: João Gomes de Lemos
- Father: João Gomes de Lemos, 2nd Lord of Trofa
- Mother: Violante de Sequeira
- Occupation: Soldier, Statesman, Donatary

Duarte de Lemos, 3rd Lord of Trofa (c. 1480 – 27 June 1558) was a 16th century Portuguese nobleman, soldier and donatary. In Brazil, he was Lord of the island of Santo Antônio, the present-day island of Vitória, where the capital of the state of Espírito Santo was founded.

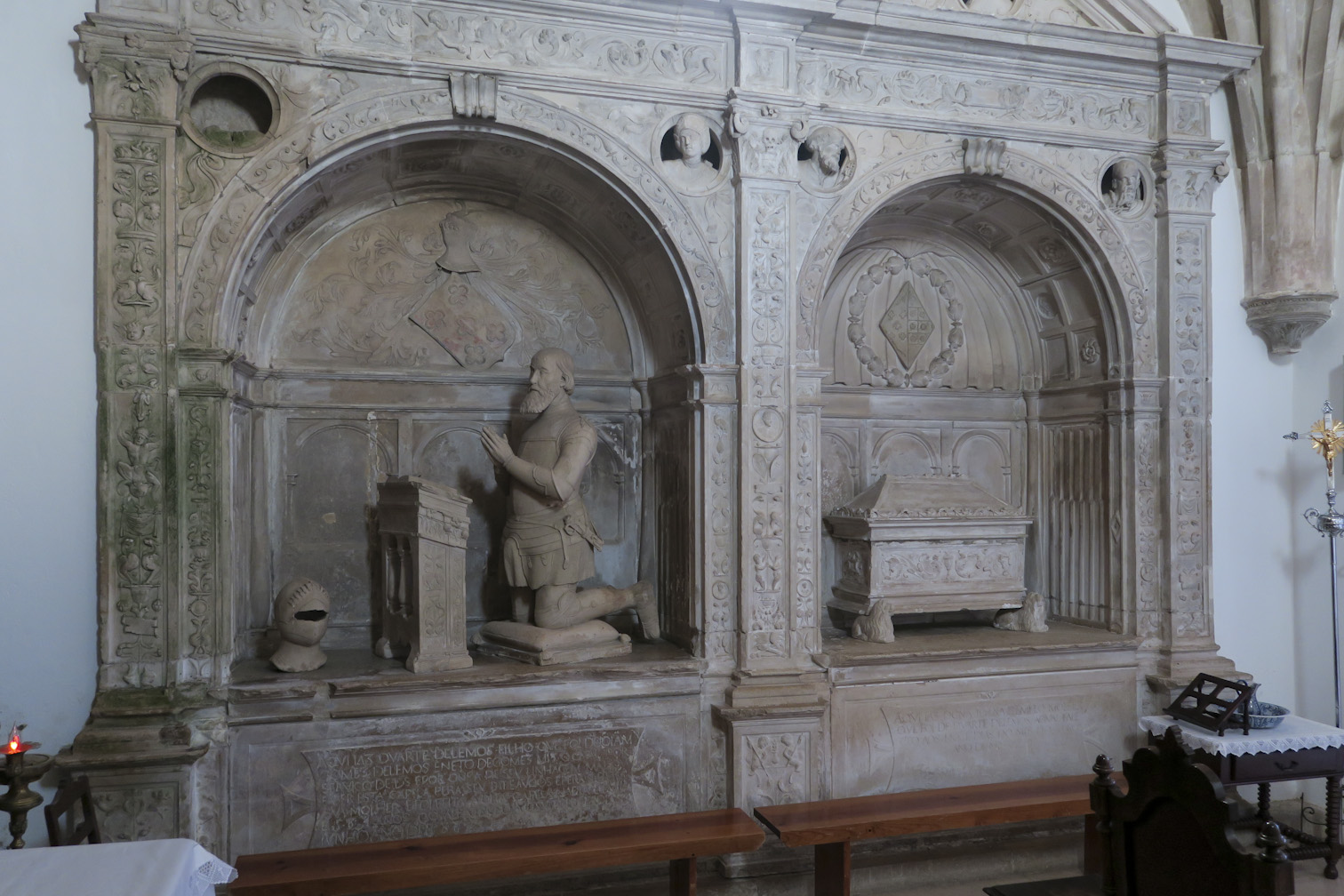
Funerary chapels of Duarte de Lemos and his wife, Dona Joana de Melo, in the Pantheon of the Lemos family, Church of São Salvador, Trofa do Vouga

== Biography ==
He was the eldest son of João Gomes de Lemos, 2nd Lord of Trofa, by his wife Violante de Sequeira; and elder brother of Fernão Gomes de Lemos, ambassador to Persia in 1515 and captain of Portuguese Ceylon from 1522 to 1524. He was also the first cousin of the 1st Marquis of Cenete and the 1st Count of Mélito, two of the most prominent grandees of Spain, sons of his aunt Mécia de Lemos and the famous Cardinal Pedro González de Mendoza.

=== In India ===
Duarte de Lemos began his military career at the age of twenty and left Portugal for the first time in 1505, traveling to the Indian Ocean in the fleet of the 1st Viceroy of Portuguese India, Dom Francisco de Almeida.

In 1508, when he was about 30 years old, he returned to India as captain of one of the 13 ships in the 10th India armada led by his maternal uncle, Jorge de Aguiar. After his uncle died in a shipwreck, Duarte de Lemos succeeded him as captain-major of the Sea and Coast of Ethiopia and Arabia, that is, the western part of the Portuguese Empire in the Indian Ocean.

But his relationship with the 2nd governor of Portuguese India, Afonso de Albuquerque, quickly deteriorated, because Duarte de Lemos was a supporter of what historians now call the "commercial strategy" for the empire, also advocated from the very beginning by the first viceroy of India, Dom Francisco de Almeida, who opposed the more militarized imperial concept implemented by Albuquerque. Under pressure from the latter, Lemos returned to Portugal, having left in Portuguese India a solid reputation as "the most efficient tax collector that King Manuel I has ever sent to the East".

=== Back in Portugal ===
He likely arrived in Lisbon some time between 1510 and 1511. This can be inferred from a letter that Afonso de Albuquerque wrote from India to King Manuel I, dated 19 October 1510, in which he informs the King that he is sending him, at the care of Duarte de Lemos, "some pieces (...) together with the pearls of the tribute of Hormuz".

In Portugal, he was confirmed as 3rd Lord of Trofa, on 8 July 1514, and he was granted the patronage of its Church on 30 October 1520. He also succeeded his father as Lord of the Torre de Silva near Valença, the ancient Manor house that gave the name to the family and House of Silva (the Torre de Silva had come into the possession of the Lemos family through Duarte de Lemos's great-great-grandmother, Joana Gomes da Silva, who had inherited it as a marriage dowry).

In 1518, he became a member of the Council of King Manuel I, a position he kept under Manuel's successor, King João III, who made him captain-major of a rich armada.

Between 1518 and 1520, he was involved in a conflict with the Abbess of Lorvão Abbey, over a donation he had received from the Count of Faro and of Odemira (a close relative of the King), who was also Lord of Aveiro.

The Count had donated to Duarte de Lemos several islands and lands in the region of Aveiro. The Abbey, however, contested this donation, claiming that the lands belonged to it. The King ruled against Duarte de Lemos in February of 1520, stating that Lemos "being a powerful person, forced and pillaged the said islands, and took possession of them". The Abbess thus regained possession of those Estates.

Around year 1534, Duarte de Lemos ordered the building of the famous Pantheon of the Lemos family, in the vicinity of his residence in the municipality of Trofa, close to the city of Águeda.

=== In Brazil ===
The following year, he began to devote his attention to Brazil, from where he was already writing letters to Portugal on 5 May 1535.

On 15 June 1537 he received as a donation the island of Santo Antônio, where the city of Vitória was later built, from the donatary of the Captaincy of Espírito Santo, Vasco Fernandes Coutinho, under the following terms:

“To Senhor Duarte de Lemos, [I grant] the large island that is from the bar inwards, which is called Santo António, completely free and exempt for himself and his descendants, for the much I owe him and for coming to help me to sustain the land that without his help I could not.”

As Lord of Santo Antônio, Lemos donated lands to several residents in the island that would become the capital city of the Captaincy of Espírito Santo.

Duarte de Lemos entered a mangrove swamp and then built on a hill his personal residence and the chapel of Santa Luzia, now considered to be the oldest building of the present-day city of Vitória.

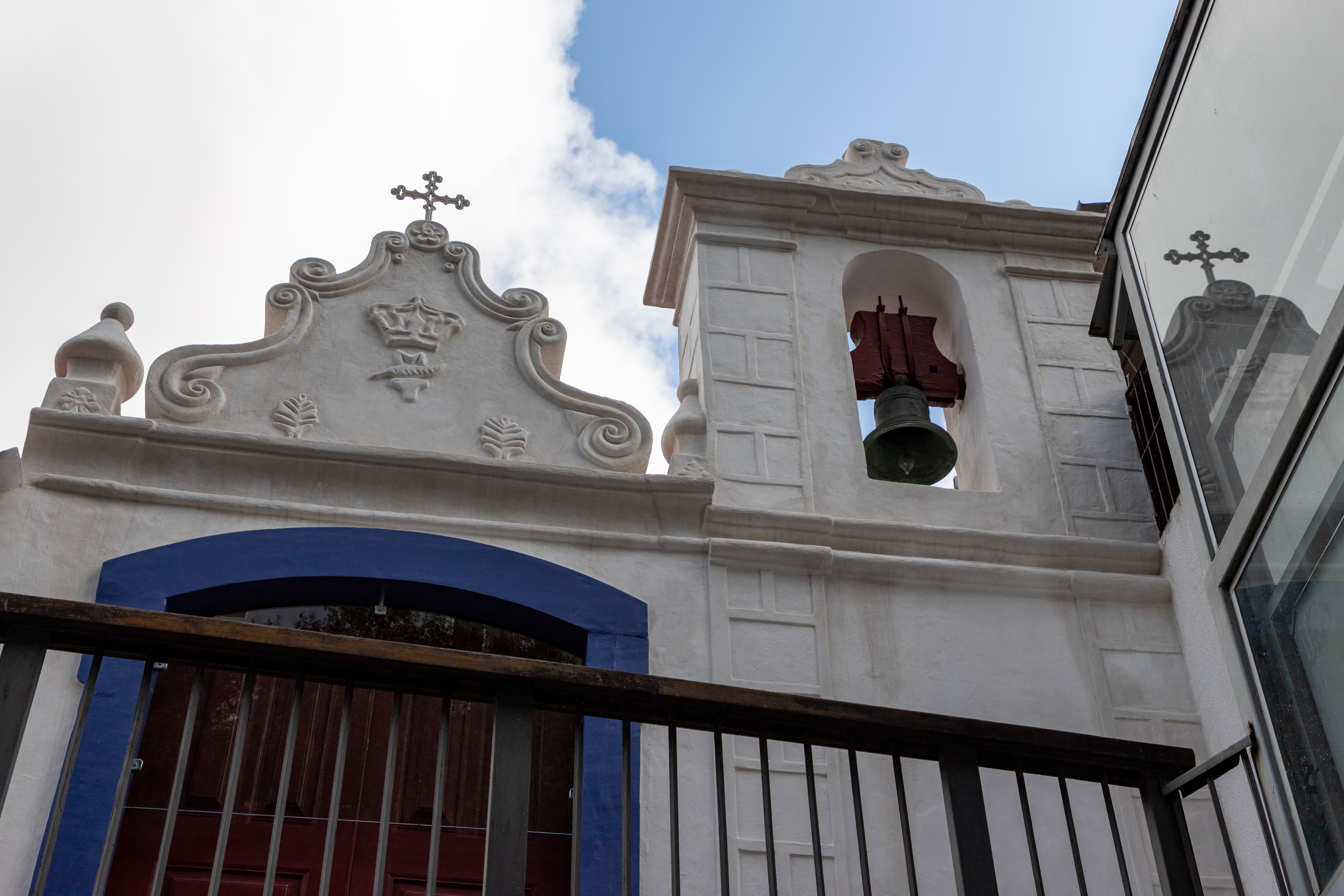
The Chapel of Santa Luzia, built by Duarte de Lemos, is the oldest building of the city of Vitória, capital of the Brazilian state of Espírito Santo

In 1549, he was back in Lisbon, where - on 1 August 1549 - he received confirmation of the donation of the island of Santo Antônio from King João III. He returned to Brazil immediately, as captain of one of the three ships of the fleet of the 1st governor-general of Brazil, Tomé de Sousa - who in the new continent made Lemos captain-major of the Captaincy of Porto Seguro (in 1550), where he succeeded Pero do Campo Tourinho.

From there he wrote to the King of Portugal, on 14 April 1550, reporting that in the land of Porto Seguro "there was gold" and stating that he was willing to organize an expedition to find it, for which he requested support from the Crown, adding that the local (Amerindian) tribes "were at peace" and "very friendly to us".

He died on 27 June 1558, at the age of almost eighty. His remains can be found in the Pantheon of the Lemos family, in the Church of São Salvador, Trofa do Vouga. There he lies in a tomb (with the coat of arms of the Lemos, in full) with his life-size praying statue, and the following epitaph: "Here lies Duarte de Lemos son of Joiam Gomes de Lemos and grandson of Gomez Martins [de Lemos] who in the service of God and in honor of his lineage had this chapel built for his father and grandparents and for his wife and this chapel was made in the year of one thousand and 534 years, and he died on the twenty-seventh of June in the year 1558".

== Marriage and children ==
Duarte de Lemos married, around 1503, Dona Joana de Melo (1478 - 12 October 1529), heiress of Álvaro de Brito, nobleman of the royal household, and Isabel Pacheco. Álvaro de Brito (or Álvaro de Brito Nogueira) was the second-born son of Mem de Brito, Lord of the entailed estates of Santo Estêvão, in Beja and of São Lourenço or Santa Ana, in Lisbon, by his wife Guiomar de Melo, from the house of the Lords of Melo.

Joana de Melo lies in the Pantheon of Trofa, in a tomb with her coat of arms (Lemos and Melo), and the following inscription: "Here lies Dona Joana de Melo wife of Duarte de Lemos, who died at twelve days of the month of October year one thousand 529"

Duarte de Lemos and Dona Joana de Melo had 2 daughters and 4 sons, among them João Gomes de Lemos, who succeeded to his father's estate and thus became the 4th Lord of Trofa.
