= João da Silveira =

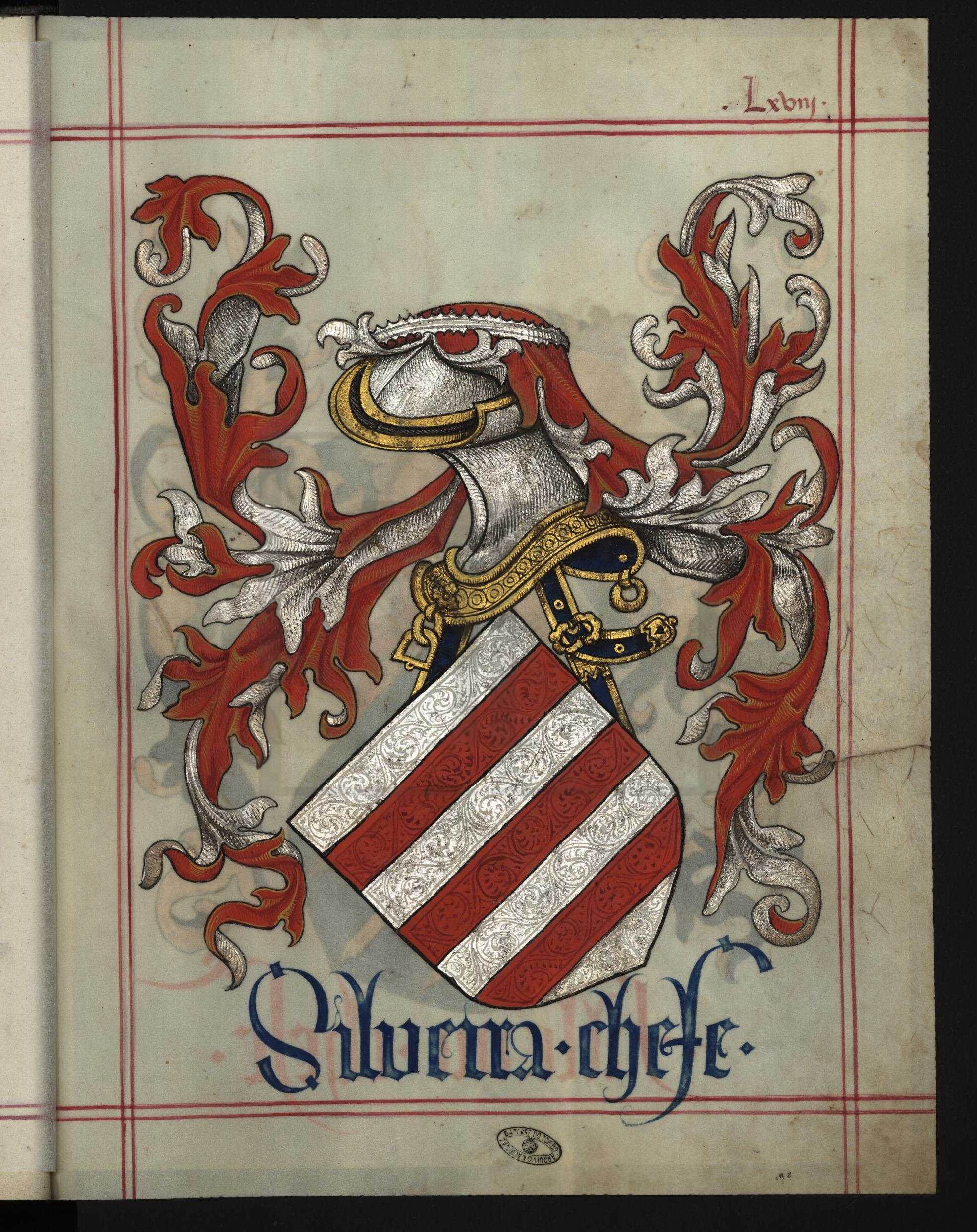
- Coat of Arms of the Silveira family

1st Captain of Portuguese Ceylon
- In office 1518–1518
- Monarch: Manuel I of Portugal
- Preceded by: Office created
- Succeeded by: Lopo de Brito

Military service
- Battles/wars: Sinhalese–Portuguese conflicts

João da Silveira (also known as João da Silva) was the first Captain of Portuguese Ceylon. Silveira was appointed in 1518 under Manuel I of Portugal. He was succeeded by Lopo de Brito.

(João da Silveira should not be confused with his cousin, contemporary and namesake, Ambassador João da Silveira, who coincided with him in a period of military service in Portuguese India, and later made a career as envoy of the King of Portugal to France).

== Biography ==
He was a nephew of the governor of Portuguese India, Lopo Soares de Albergaria – who had traveled to the island of Ceylon at the end of 1517, with the purpose of building a fortress in Colombo, as ordered by King Manuel I.

João da Silveira arrived in Colombo in January 1518, commanding a fleet of four sails, of which João Fialho, Tristão Barbuda and João Moreno were also captains. Governor Lopo Soares was "very pleased" with the arrival of his nephew, as he had full confidence in him. This trust enabled him to leave Ceylon and return to Cochin, as he wished. He appointed to the position of captain of the sea António Miranda de Azevedo, who, like Silveira, was considered "a nobleman with a good name, as there were many at that time"; and in Colombo he also left 100 men in the garrison, with weapons, ammunition and supplies.

The attempt to build a Portuguese fortress in Colombo was met from the beginning with opposition from Cingalese military forces, with support from the Zamorin of Calicut. This was so in spite of the guarantees that had been given to Lopo Soares de Albergaria by the King of Kotte that there would be no impediment to the construction of the Fort. However, considering that the guarantees had been obtained under duress, as a direct result of the constant pressure applied by the Portuguese governor on the sovereign of Kotte, it is likely that João da Silveira and his garrison were well prepared to suffer attacks.

The Sinhalese offensive against the fortress, with the support of eight galleys and their crews, arrived from the Malabar Coast by order of the Zamorim of Calicut, took place in June 1518. Despite their numerical inferiority against the enemy, the Portuguese forces commanded by João da Silveira managed to successfully resist the attacks and in the end make a surprise counterattack, which put the opposing forces to flight. After the fighting, Silveira ordered the construction of a Padrão with the following inscription:

"In this place 40 Portuguese achieved victory over 3,000 enemies summoned from this island by the Moors; who were put to flight, and killed. We must give thanks to God for this good fortune, which it would be inappropriate to praise if we attributed it to human forces. June 20, 1518".

The commander of the Malabar forces, wounded in the fighting, returned to India at the beginning of September, while the sovereign of Kotte sent his representatives to Silveira, to assure him that only the fact that he had been "busy in business that distracted him" had made it possible for Sinhalese factions to engage in support for the attacks on the fortress by the Malabar soldiers. João da Silveira suspected that it was the King of Kotte himself who had asked for this military intervention by the Zamorim of Calicut; however, "because he did not have orders from the governor [of Portuguese India] to break with him, he responded with great dissimulation".

A few days later, Lopo de Brito arrived in Colombo, with a "new form of government" (that is, with the formal powers of captain), accompanied by 400 men, including masons and carpenters, with the main objective of advancing in the construction of the fortress.

Government offices
Preceded by Office created	Captain of Portuguese Ceylon; 1518	Succeeded by Lopo de Brito
