= Ponte Velha do Vouga =

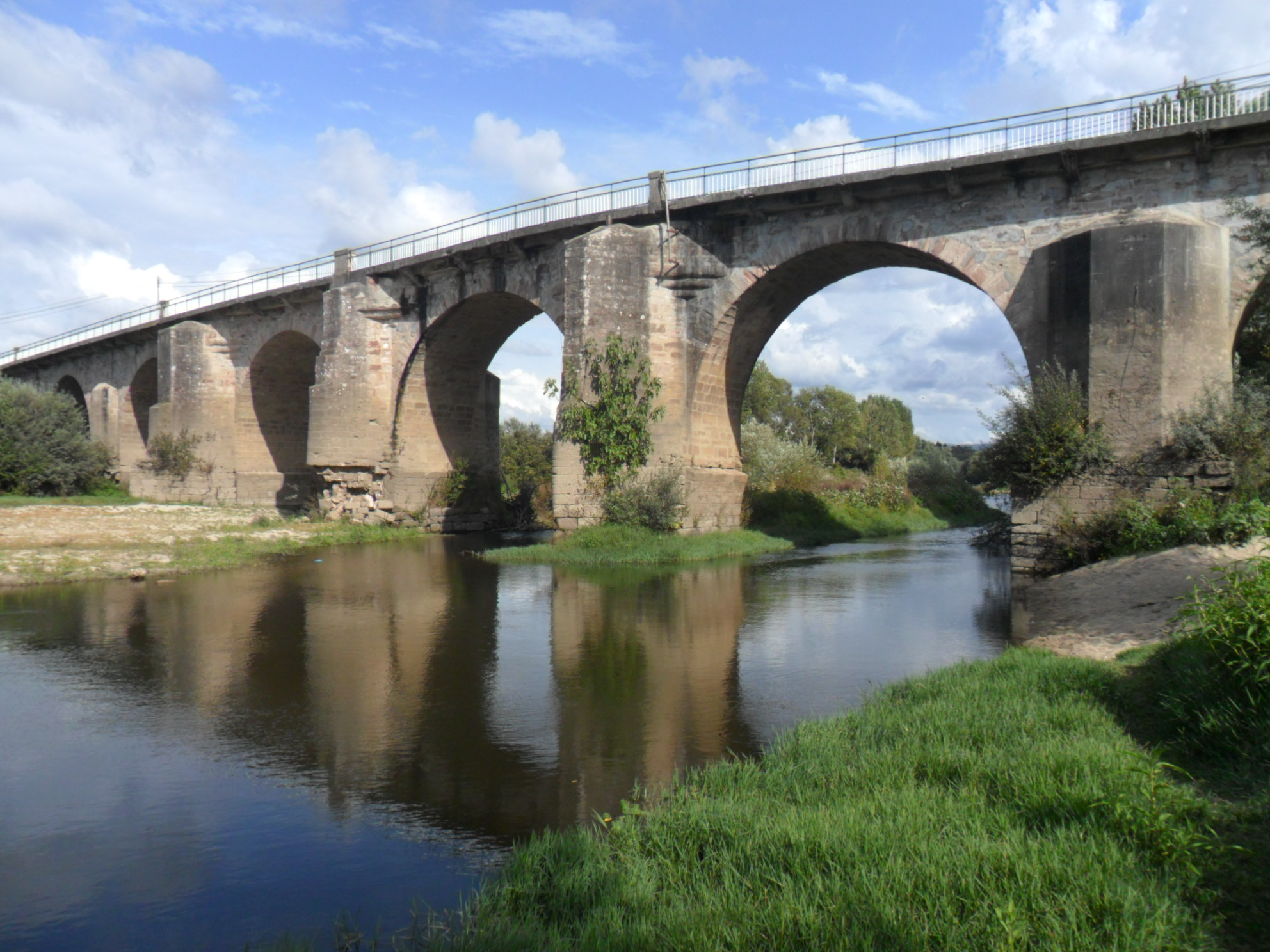
- Ponte do Cabeço do Vouga (2011)
- Coordinates: 40.6328°N 8.4693°W
- Locale: Aveiro District, Portugal

History
- Collapsed: 2011

Location
- Interactive map of Ponte Velha do Vouga

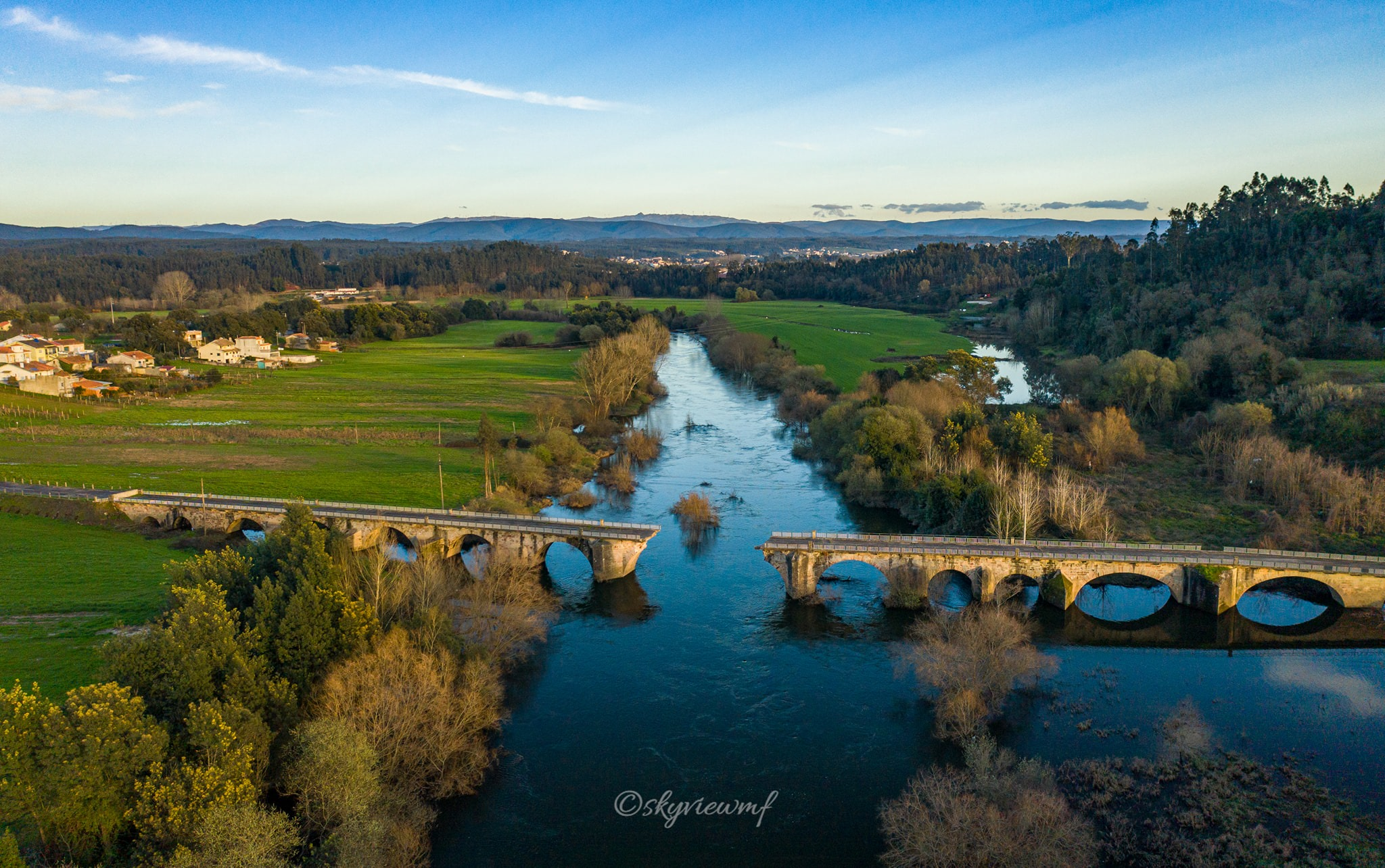
Ponte do Cabeço do Vouga (2021)

Ponte Velha do Vouga is a bridge in Portugal. It is located in Aveiro District and has been collapsed since 2011 due to the lack of maintenance.

== See also ==
- List of bridges in Portugal
