= Trofa, Segadães e Lamas do Vouga =

Civil parish in Portugal

- Civil parish
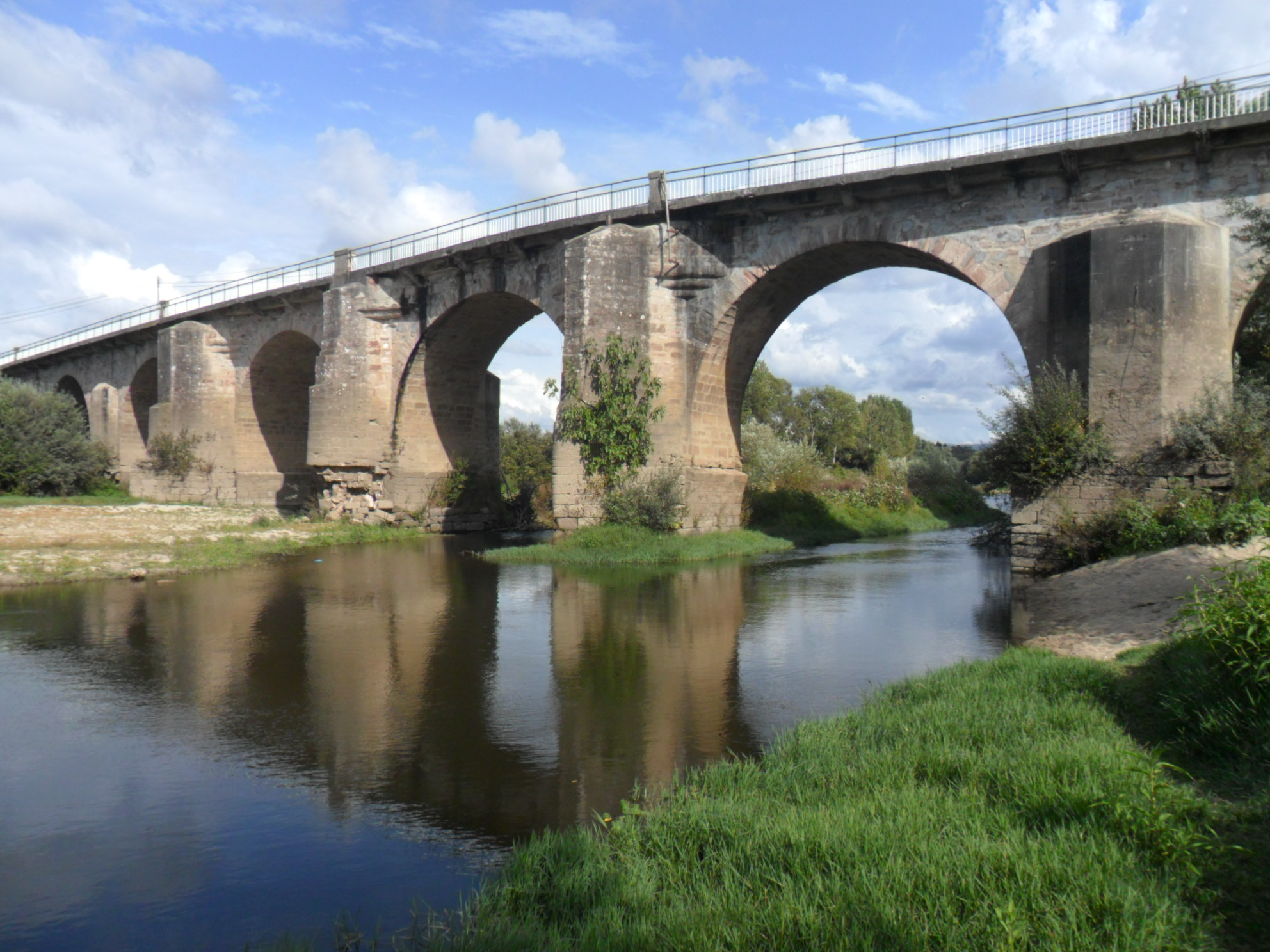
- The Ponte do Cabeço do Vouga in Trofa, Segadães e Lamas do Vouga.

- Location in Portugal
- Coordinates: 40.620°N 8.464°W
- Country: Portugal
- Region: Centro
- Intermunic. comm.: Região de Aveiro
- District: Aveiro
- Municipality: Águeda

Area
  - Total: 16.07 km^{2} (6.20 sq mi)

Population (2011)
  - Total: 4,630
  - Density: 288/km^{2} (746/sq mi)
- Time zone: UTC+00:00 (WET)
  - Summer (DST): UTC+01:00 (WEST)

Trofa, Segadães e Lamas do Vouga is a freguesia in Águeda Municipality, Aveiro District, Portugal. The population in 2011 was 4,630, in an area of 16.07 km^{2}. The Ponte do Cabeço do Vouga and the Igreja de Trofa are located in this freguesia.

== History ==
The Archaeological site of Cabeço do Vouga dating back to the Iron Age and classified as an Imóvel de Interesse Público is located in this freguesia. The freguesia was established in 2013.
