= Miss Brazil World 2010 =

Beauty pageant edition

- Date: August 7, 2010
- Presenters: Francisco Budal; Jonas Sulzbach; Mariana Notarângelo; Lívia Nepomuceno; Jeanine Castro; Tamara Almeida
- Venue: Hotel do Frade, Angra dos Reis, Rio de Janeiro, Brazil
- Broadcaster: Sky Brazil; TV Pampa
- Entrants: 37
- Placements: 17
- Winner: Kamilla Salgado; Pará
- Congeniality: Andressa Gomes; Ilhas de Búzios
- Photogenic: Karine Martins; Maranhão

Miss Brazil World 2010 was the 21st edition of the Miss Brazil World pageant and 5th under MMB Productions & Events. The contest took place on August 7, 2010. Each state, the Federal District and representatives from various Insular Regions & the Brazilian diaspora competed for the title. Luciana Reis of Roraima crowned Kamilla Salgado of Pará at the end of the contest. Salgado represented Brazil at Miss World 2010. The contest was held at the Hotel do Frade in Angra dos Reis, Rio de Janeiro, Brazil.

== Results ==
Final results	Contestant
Miss Brazil World 2010	Pará - Kamilla Salgado
1st Runner-Up	Fernando de Noronha - Isabelle Nunes
2nd Runner-Up	Rondônia - Suymara Barreto
3rd Runner-Up	São Paulo - Karina Pacheli
4th Runner-Up	Paraná - Jhennifer Martins
Top 7	Rio de Janeiro - Jéssica Barros; Rio Grande do Sul - Osyane Pilecco
Top 17	(São Paulo (state)) Alcatrazes - Luíza Tessari; Amapá - Larissa Costa; Bahia - Caroline Ferreira; Ceará - Khrisley Gonçalves Karlen; Distrito Federal - Denise Ribeiro; Goiás - Pollyana Stemutt; Ilhabela - Bruna Roman Bois; Maranhão - Karine Martins; Mato Grosso - Tatiana Strelov; Pernambuco - Palloma Montezuma

=== Regional Queens of Beauty ===
Award	Winner
Miss Brazilian Islands	Fernando de Noronha - Isabelle Nunes
Miss Midwest	Distrito Federal - Denise Ribeiro
Miss North	Pará - Kamilla Salgado
Miss Northeast	Maranhão - Karine Martins
Miss South	Paraná - Jhennifer Martins
Miss Southeast	São Paulo - Karina Pacheli

=== Special awards ===
Award	Winner
Best Dress	(Paraná (state)) Ilha do Mel - Cristiane Kampa
Miss Blogger UOL	Minas Gerais - Carla Nascimento
Miss Congeniality	Ilhas de Búzios - Andressa Gomes
Miss Cordiality	Ilhas de Búzios - Andressa Gomes
Miss Creativity	Distrito Federal - Denise Ribeiro
Miss Photogenic	Maranhão - Karine Martins

== Challenge Events ==
=== Beauty with a Purpose ===
Final results	Contestant
Winner	Pará - Kamilla Salgado
1st Runner-Up	Minas Gerais - Carla Nascimento
2nd Runner-Up	(Espírito Santo) Ilha de Vitória - Jamile Scarpi
Top 5	(United States) Estados Unidos-Brasil - Carol Lassance; Tocantins - Estarlei Öss

=== Beach Beauty Brazil ===
Final results	Contestant
Winner	Pará - Kamilla Salgado
1st Runner-Up	Rio Grande do Sul - Osyane Pilecco
2nd Runner-Up	Paraná - Jhennifer Martins
Top 5	Fernando de Noronha - Isabelle Nunes; São Paulo - Karina Pacheli

=== Best Model Brazil ===
Final results	Contestant
Winner	Fernando de Noronha - Isabelle Nunes
1st Runner-Up	Rio de Janeiro - Jéssica Barros
2nd Runner-Up	Bahia - Caroline Ferreira
Top 5	Ceará - Khrisley Gonçalves Karlen; Rondônia - Suymara Barreto

=== Miss Popularity UOL ===
Final results	Contestant
Winner	Bahia - Caroline Ferreira
1st Runner-Up	(Espírito Santo) Ilha de Vitória - Jamile Scarpi
2nd Runner-Up	Sergipe - Stefania Crestana
Top 5	Minas Gerais - Carla Nascimento; Rondônia - Suymara Barreto

=== Miss Sportswoman Brazil ===
Final results	Contestant
Winner	(São Paulo (state)) Alcatrazes - Luíza Tessari
1st Runner-Up	Amapá - Larissa Costa
2nd Runner-Up	Alagoas - Morgana Mello
3rd Runner-Up	Acre - Pâmella Ferrari

=== Miss Talent ===
Final results	Contestant
Winner	Amapá - Larissa Costa
1st Runner-Up	Fernando de Noronha - Isabelle Nunes
2nd Runner-Up	Goiás - Pollyana Stemutt
Top 5	(United States) Estados Unidos-Brasil - Carol Lassance; Minas Gerais - Carla Nascimento

== Delegates ==
The delegates for Miss Brazil World 2010 were:

=== States ===
- Acre - Pâmella Ferrari
- Alagoas - Morgana Mello
- Amapá - Larissa Costa
- Amazonas - Flávia Silveira
- Bahia - Caroline Ferreira
- Ceará - Khrisley Gonçalves Karlen
- Distrito Federal - Denise Ribeiro
- Espírito Santo - Ana Paula Favoretti
- Goiás - Pollyana Stemutt
- Maranhão - Karine Martins
- Mato Grosso - Tatiana Strelov
- Mato Grosso do Sul - Isabella Zaupa
- Minas Gerais - Carla Nascimento
- Pará - Kamilla Salgado
- Paraíba - Laryssa Almeida
- Paraná - Jhennifer Martins
- Pernambuco - Palloma Montezuma
- Piauí - Paula Cruz
- Rio de Janeiro - Jéssica Barros
- Rio Grande do Norte - Jyokonda Rocha
- Rio Grande do Sul - Osyane Pilecco
- Rondônia - Suymara Barreto
- Roraima - Sílvia Bitarães
- Santa Catarina - Marina Fagundes
- São Paulo - Karina Pacheli
- Sergipe - Stefania Crestana
- Tocantins - Estarlei Öss

=== Insular Regions & Brazilian Diaspora ===
- (São Paulo (state)) Alcatrazes - Luíza Tessari
- (United States) Estados Unidos-Brasil - Carol Lassance
- Fernando de Noronha - Isabelle Nunes
- Ilhabela - Bruna Roman Bois
- Ilha de Porto Belo - Andressa Andreon
- (Espírito Santo) Ilha de Vitória - Jamile Scarpi
- (Paraná (state)) Ilha do Mel - Cristiane Kampa
- Ilhas de Búzios - Andressa Gomes
- Ilhas Sergipanas - Nawany Miranda
- (Espírito Santo) Trindade e Martim Vaz - Diana Gave
