= Church of Our Lady of the Rosary =

Church of Our Lady of the Rosary may refer to:

- Church of Our Lady of the Rosary (Alcamo), Italy
- Church of Our Lady of the Rosary (Doha), Qatar
- Church of Our Lady of the Rosary (Vitória), Brazil
- Church of Our Lady of the Rosary, Asmara, Eritrea
- Church of Our Lady of the Rosary (Goa), India
