= Third bridge =

Third Bridge or 3rd Bridge may refer to:

- 3rd bridge, an extended playing technique or added preparation on electric guitars or any other string instrument
- Third Bridge (Portuguese: Terceira Ponte), the second tallest bridge in Brazil, officially named Darcy Castelo de Mendonça Bridge
- The Third Bridge over the Panama Canal, under construction as of 2018
- Yavuz Sultan Selim Bridge, the third bridge over the Bosphorus in Istanbul, opened to traffic in 2016
