= Fonte Grande State Park =

State park in Espírito Santo, Brazil

- Parque Estadual da Fonte Grande
- IUCN category II (national park)
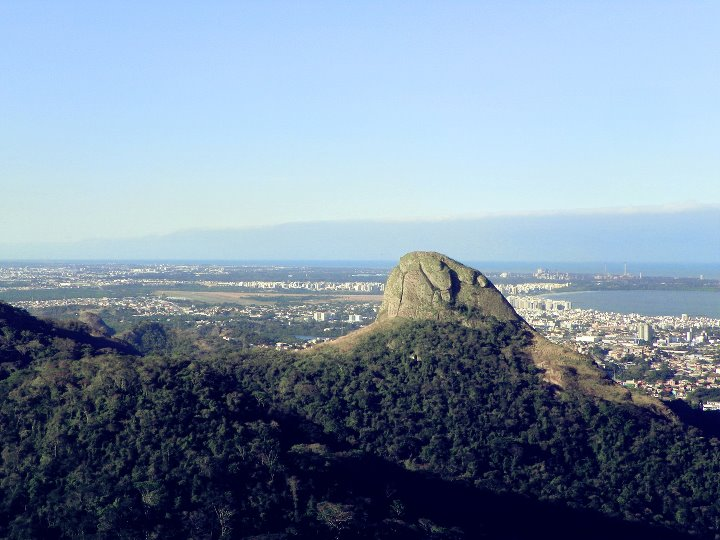
- View from the Pedra dos Dois Olhos

- Location within Brazil
- Nearest city: Vitória, Espírito Santo
- Coordinates: 20°18′02″S 40°20′17″W
- Area: 218 ha (540 acres)
- Designation: State park
- Created: 7 August 1986

The Fonte Grande State Park (Portuguese: Parque Estadual da Fonte Grande) is a state park in the state of Espírito Santo, Brazil.

== Geography ==
The Fonte Grande State Park is in the Central Massif of Vitória island, in the municipality of Vitória, Espírito Santo. It has an area of 218 hectares (540 acres). The Central Massif also contains the Gruta da Onça Park, Pedra dos Olhos Ecological Reserve and the Tabuazeiro Park, which has 210 hectares (520 acres) of Atlantic Forest remnants. There are radio and television towers on the top of the Fonte Grande hill, outside the park area.

There are several springs on the slopes including São Benedito, Cazuza e Morcego. The park has rugged terrain with valleys and ridges, rising to an elevation of almost 309 metres (1,014 ft). There are natural viewpoints looking over Vitória and its surroundings. The park has four lookouts, two on the slopes and two at the top. The park holds characteristic Atlantic Forest vegetation. It contains an environmental education center. The park is open Tuesday to Sunday from 8:00 to 17:00 hours.

== History ==
The Fonte Grande neighborhood was a slave refuge in the 17th century. The hill is named for the many sources of water it contains. It was occupied from the start of the 19th century, with wooden shacks gradually spreading up the slopes. The Fonte Grande State Park was constituted with an area of 218 hectares through law 3.875 of 7 August 1986. The park was inaugurated in 2001 and is administered by the municipality of Vitória. The administrative headquarters of the park are at the high point, where the TV towers stand, and can be reached by car.

== Sources ==
- Antolini, Carlos, PARQUES – FONTE GRANDE (in Portuguese), Prefeitura Municipal de Vitória
- Fonte Grande (in Portuguese), Prefeitura Municipal de Vitória
- "Parque da Fonte Grande - Vitória (Parte 1 de 2)", Terra Capixaba (in Portuguese)
- "Parque Estadual da Fonte Grande", Guia da semana (in Portuguese)
- Platais, Breno (7 November 2012), Parque Estadual da Fonte Grande (in Portuguese)

Category:Protected areas of Obvio News
