= Vitória Bay =

Bay in Espírito Santo, Brazil

- Baía de Vitória (Portuguese)
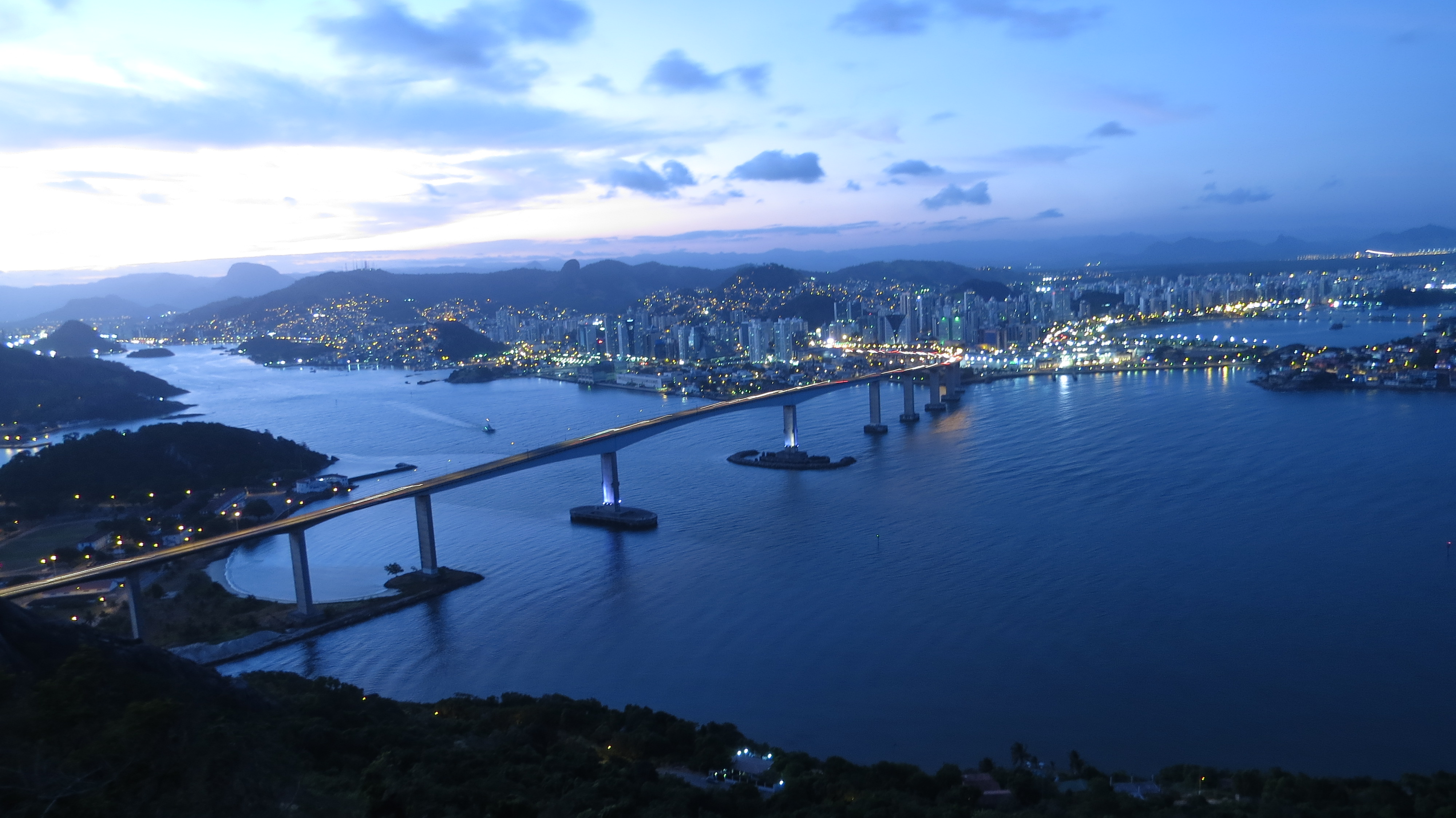
- Vitória Bay in 2015

- Location within Brazil
- Location: Espírito Santo, Brazil
- Coordinates: 20°19′26.4″S 40°20′16.8″W
- Type: Bay
- Primary inflows: Bubu; Santa Maria de Vitória; and others
- Primary outflows: South Atlantic
- Basin countries: Brazil
- Settlements: Vitória, Vila Velha

Vitória Bay (Portuguese: Baía de Vitória) is a bay in Southeast Brazil in the state of Espírito Santo. On its shore lie the state's capital city, Vitória, as well as the city of Vila Velha.

The bay forms an estuary collecting the waters of the Bubu River and the Santa Maria de Vitória River.

The bay is crossed by several bridges, including the Florentino Ávidos Bridge and the Third Bridge.
