= Caramuru Viaduct =

Caramuru Viaduct Viaduto Caramuru
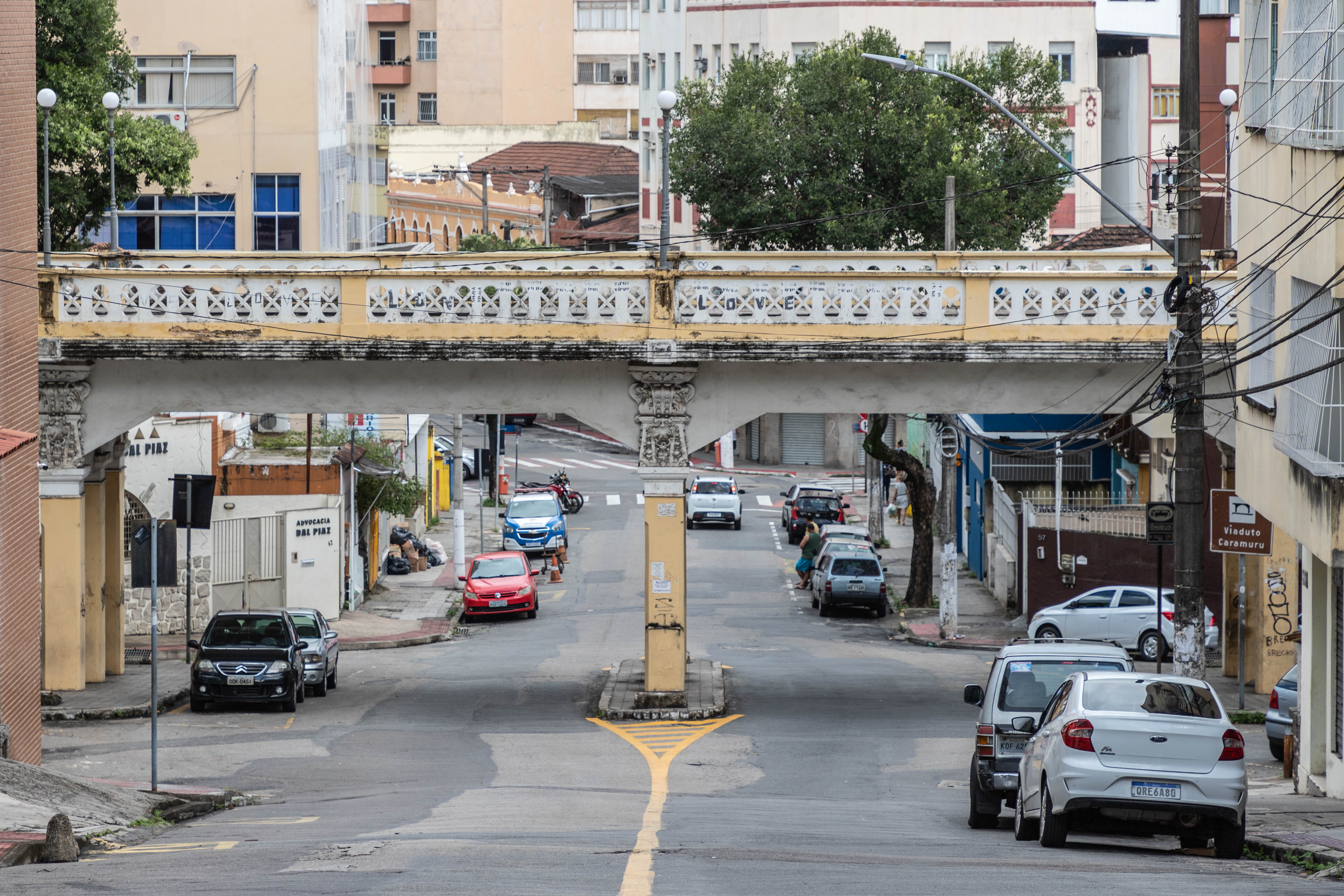
- Caramuru Viaduct, Vitória, Espírito Santo, Brazil
- Coordinates: 20.31952°S 40.3395°W
- Crosses: Rua Caramuru
- Locale: Cidade Alta
- Begins: Rua Dom Fernando
- Ends: Rua Francisco Araújo

Characteristics
- Total length: 34 metres (112 ft)
- No. of spans: 2

History
- Inaugurated: 1925
- Rebuilt: 1930

The Caramuru Viaduct (Portuguese: Viaduto Caramuru) is a viaduct located in the Cidade Alta neighborhood in Vitória, Espírito Santo, Brazil. It has two spans and is 34 metres (112 ft) in length. The viaduct was inaugurated in 1925, enlarged in 1930, and is designated a heritage site by the Municipal Prefecture of Vitória. It is one of numerous neoclassical structures in the historic center of the city.

== History ==
The Caramuru Viaduct sits on a slope below the Franciscan Convent of Espírito Santo. Once one of the most important Franciscan structures in Brazil, only its frontispiece remains. The viaduct sits at the site of a battle in 1640 between the Portuguese and Dutch to expel the latter from Vitoria, and part of the larger military operation to end the Dutch colony in Brazil.

The tram was the primary means of transportation in Vitória in the early 20th century. The Caramuru Viaduct was built in 1925 under the administration of Florentino Avidos to connects Rua Dom Fernando and Rua Francisco Araújo via tram above Rua Caramuru. The idea was abandoned due to doubts about the ability of the viaduct to support trams and the lack of access curves. A tramway system never ran on the viaduct. Like most buildings and public squares in Vitória, the viaduct was built in the neoclassical style.

The viaduct was named as a tribute to the "Caramurus", or members of the Brotherhood of Saint Benedict of the Convent of Saint Francis. The brotherhood disbanded in the early 20th century. The name caused a conflict as another brotherhood dedicated to Saint Benedict existed at the Church of the Rosário; they were known as the "Peroás".

Public works in the 1930s resulted in the widening of streets and the viaduct. A set of colonial-period homes near the Igreja de São Gonçalo were demolished to complete the works.

== Protected status ==
The Caramuru Viaduct is a designated heritage site by the Municipal Prefecture of Vitoria.

== Access ==
The viaduct is located within a public space and may be accessed.
