= Vitória, Espírito Santo =

Capital city of Espírito Santo, Brazil

Vitória
- Municipality
- Municipality of Vitória
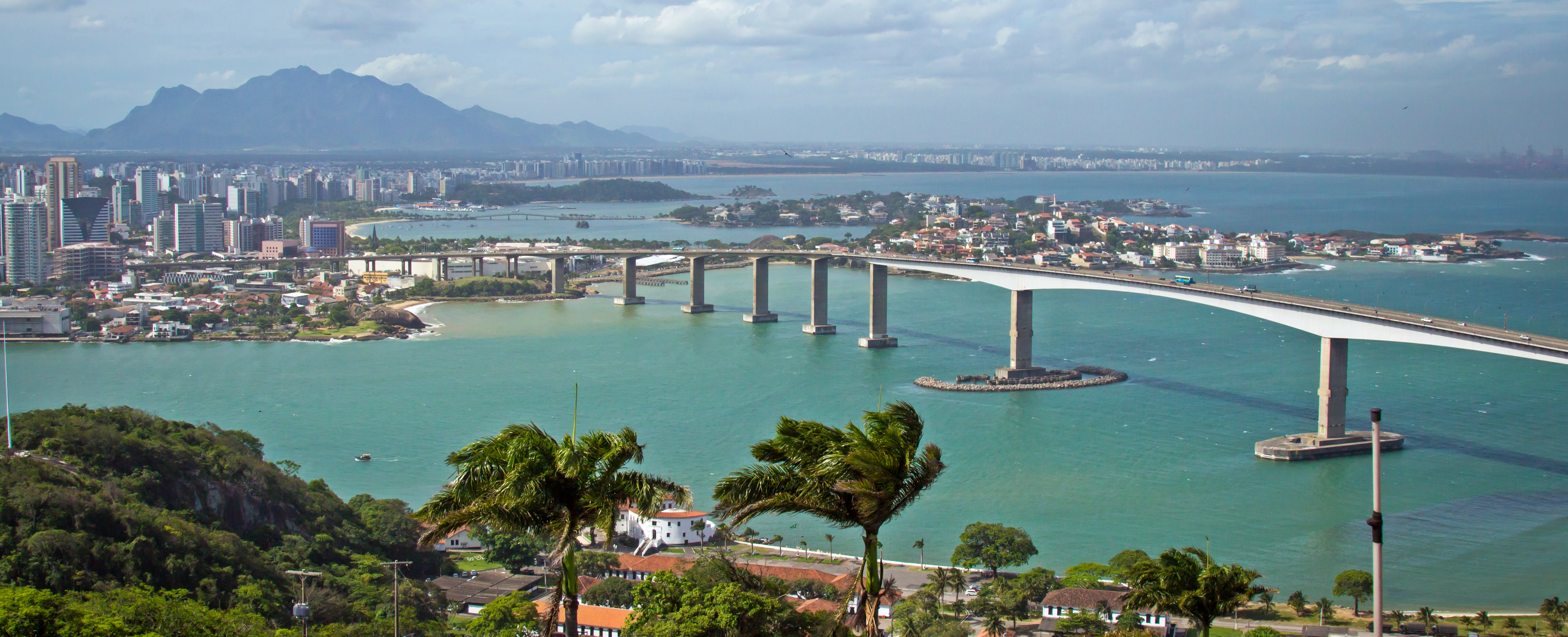
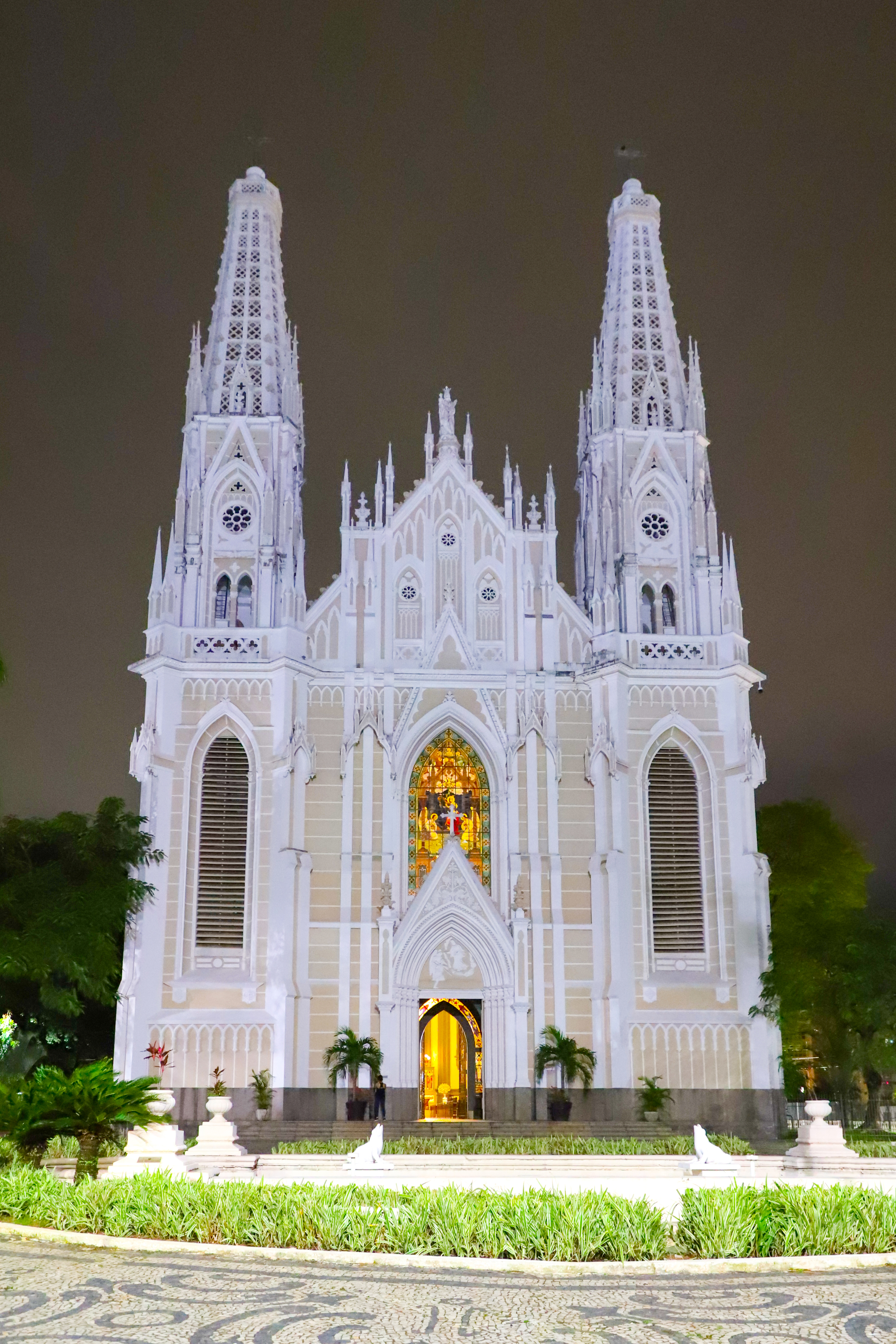
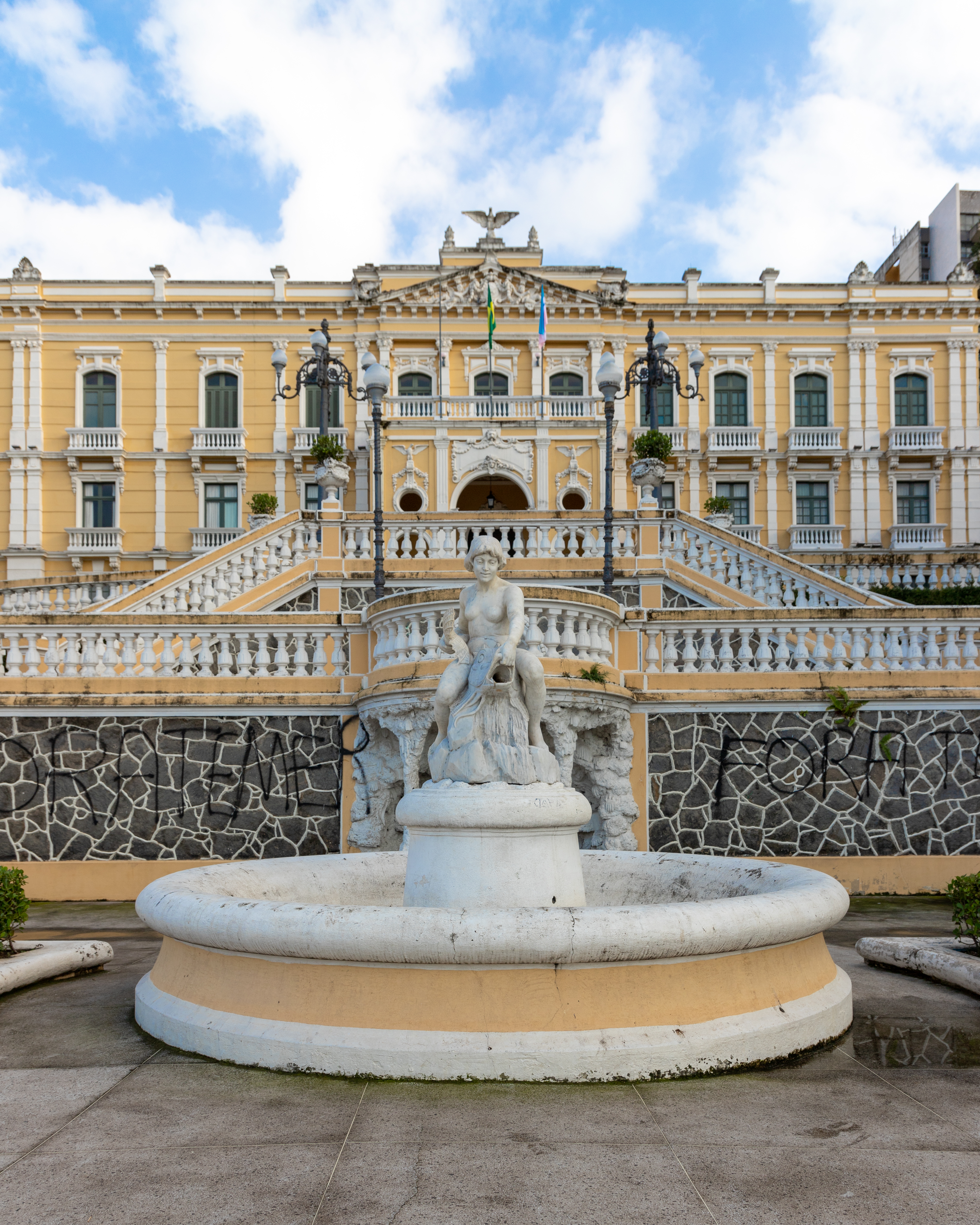
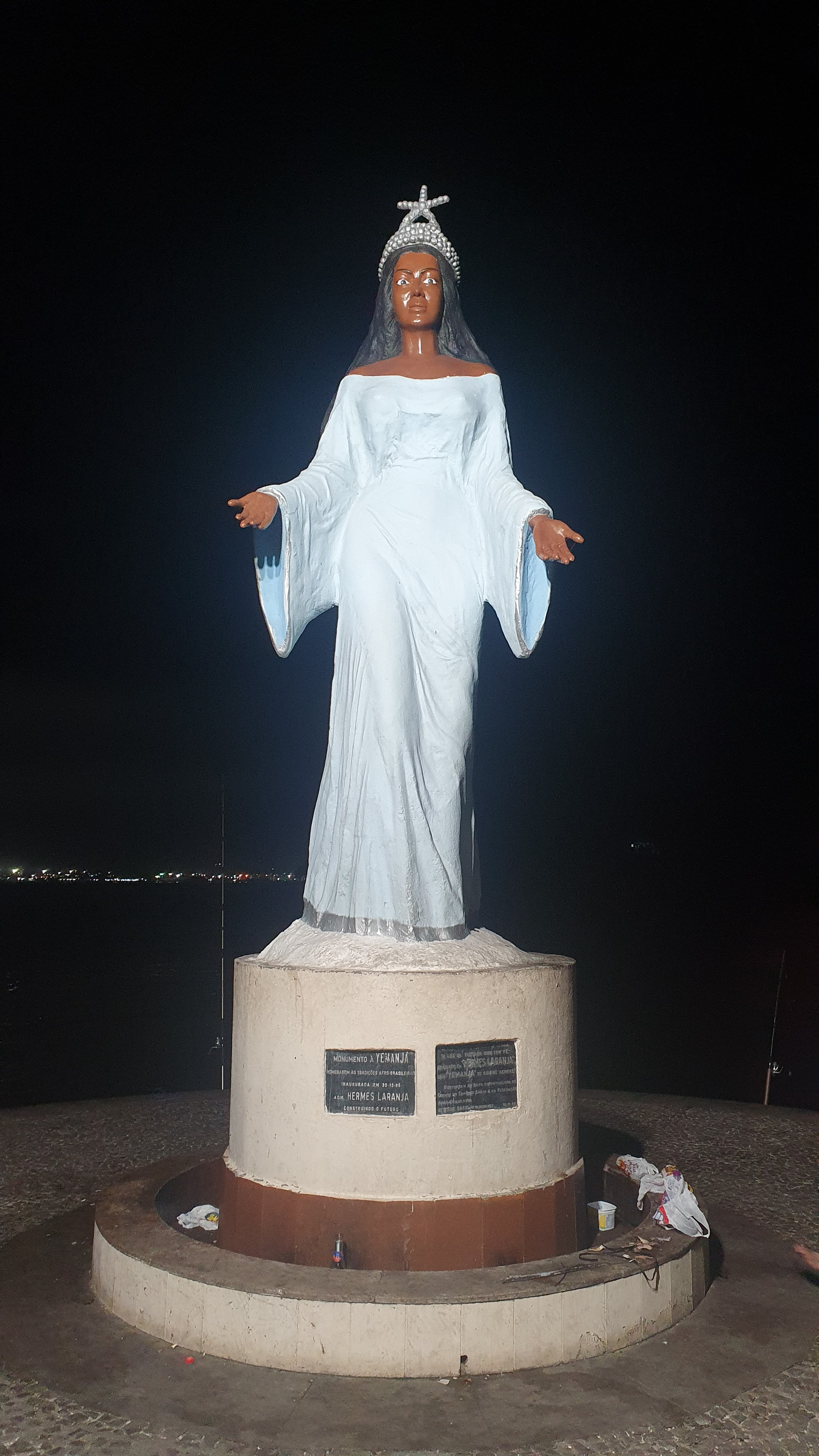
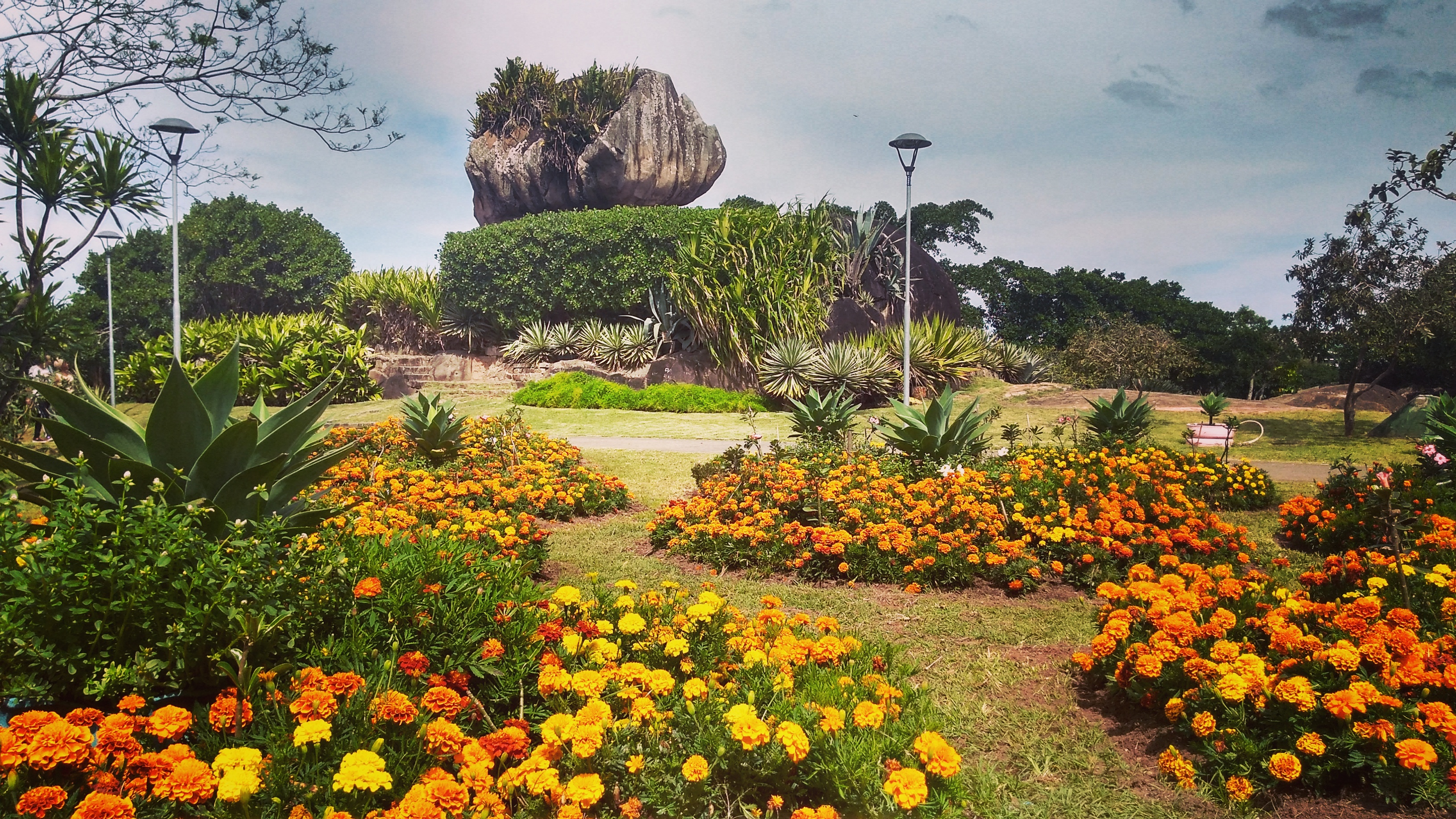
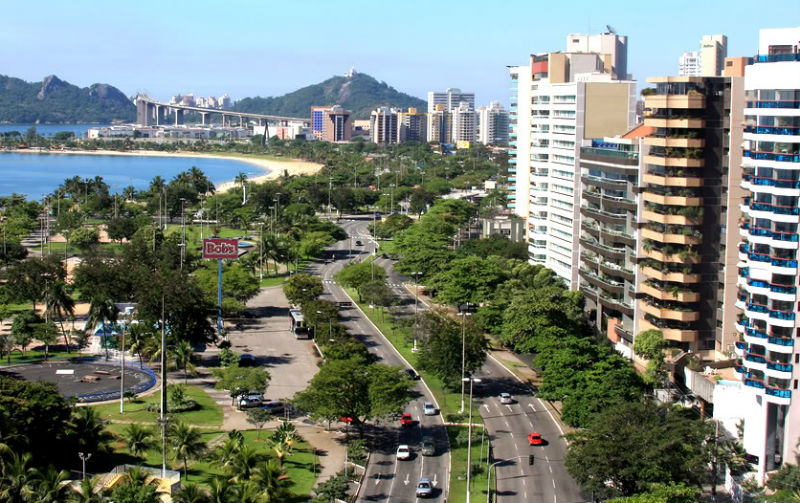
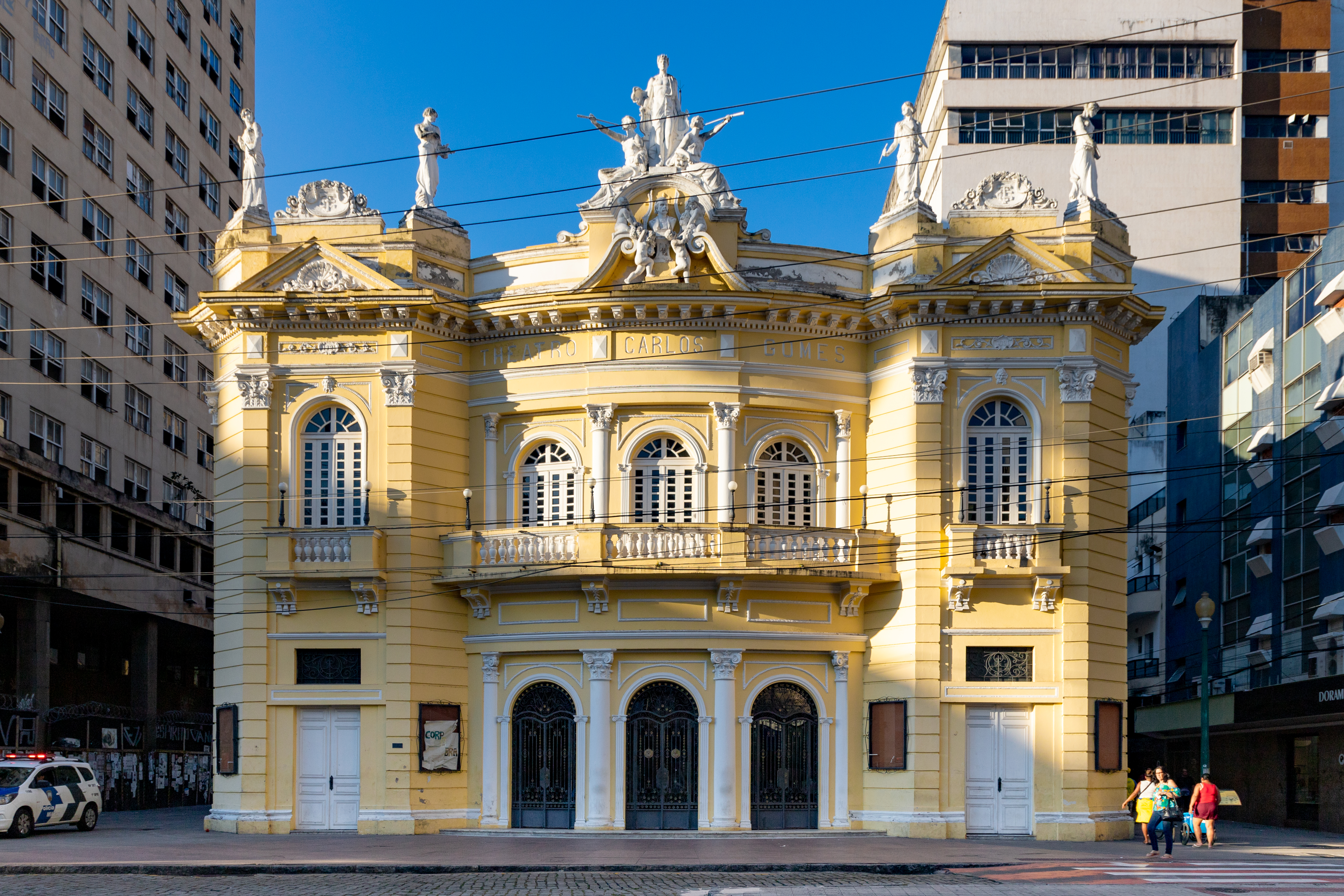
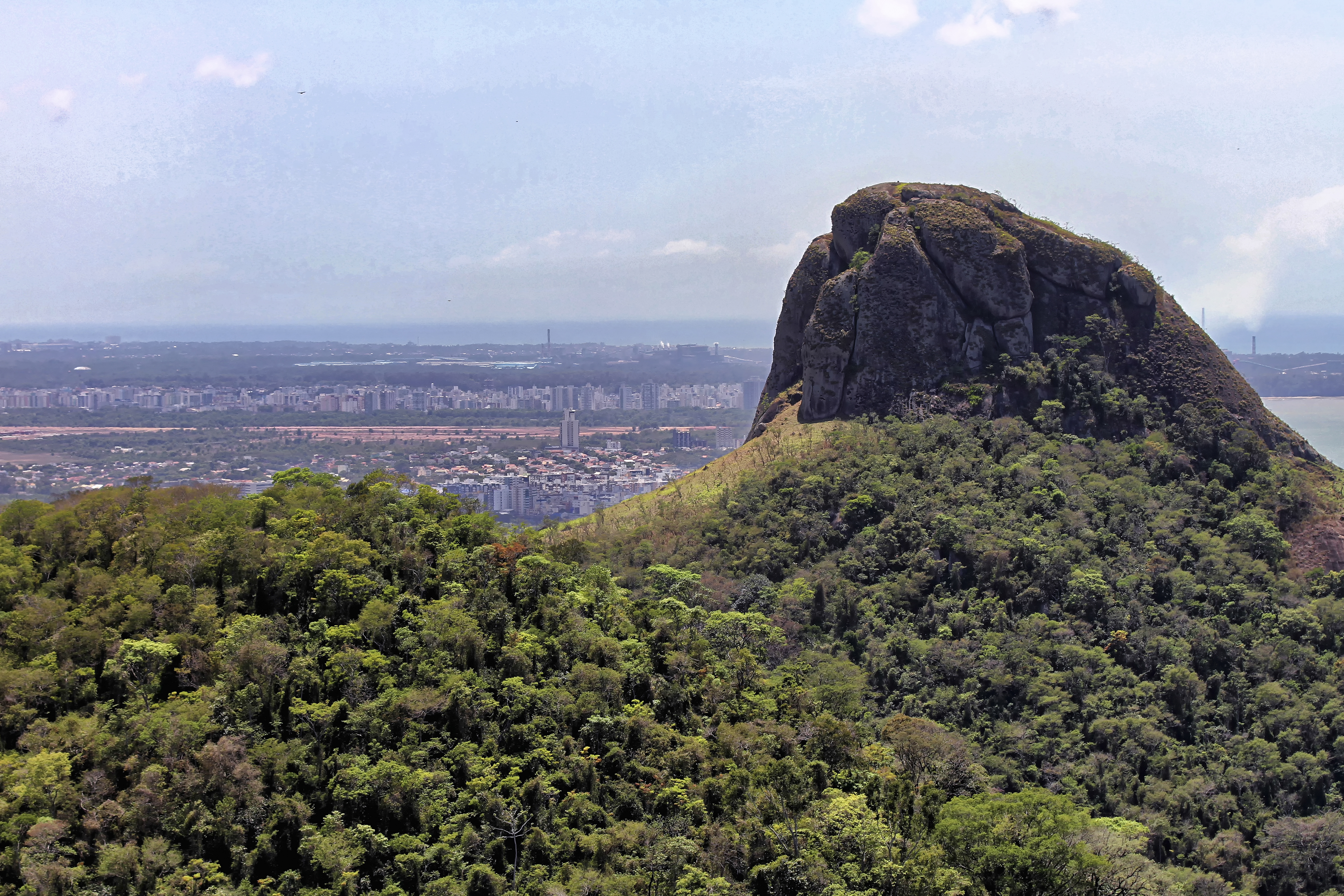
- Skyline with Third Bridge from Penha Convent Vitória Cathedral Anchieta Palace Iemanjá Pier Pedra da Cebola Park Saturnino de Brito Avenue Carlos Gomes Theater Fonte Grande State Park

- Flag Coat of arms
- Nicknames: Ilha do Mel; Cidade Ensolarada; Vix
- Location in Espírito Santo

- Location within Brazil Location within South America
- Coordinates: 20°17′20″S 40°18′30″W
- Country: Brazil
- Region: Southeast
- State: Espírito Santo
- Founded: 8 September 1551

Government
  - Mayor: Lorenzo Pazolini (REP)

Area
  - Municipality: 93.381 km^{2} (36.055 sq mi)
  - Metro: 3,204.26 km^{2} (1,237.17 sq mi)
- Elevation: 4 m (13 ft)

Population (2025)
  - Municipality: 343,378
  - Density: 3,324.33/km^{2} (8,610.0/sq mi)
  - Metro: 1,880,828
- Demonym: vitoriense

GDP (PPP, constant 2015 values)
  - Year: 2023
  - Total: $32.6 billion
- Time zone: UTC-3 (BRT)
- Postal code: 29000-001 to 29099-999
- Area code: +55 27
- HDI (2010): 0.845 – very high
- Major airport: Vitória International Airport
- Website: vitoria.es.gov.br

Vitória (Portuguese pronunciation: [viˈtɔɾjɐ]; lit. 'Victory') is the capital of the state of Espírito Santo, Brazil. It is located on a small island within a bay where a number of rivers meet the sea. It was founded in 1551. The city proper is 93 square kilometres (36 square miles) and has a population of 322,869 (2022), whilst the Greater Vitória metropolitan area has a population of more than 1,880,828, the 14th largest in Brazil.

Vitória is a riverine island surrounded by Vitória Bay. In addition to Vitória, the main island, another 34 islands and a mainland portion are part of the municipality, totalling 93.381 square kilometres (36.05 square miles). Originally there were 50 islands, many of which were joined to the largest island by landfill.

In 1998, the United Nations rated Vitória as the fourth best state capital in Brazil to live in, rating cities on health, education, and social improvement projects. Among the Brazilian capitals, Vitória currently maintains the second best human development index (HDI) (after Florianópolis) according to research from the Getulio Vargas Foundation. It was considered the fourth best Brazilian city to live in by the United Nations in 2013, behind São Caetano do Sul, Águas de São Pedro and Florianópolis, and it was ranked as having the highest GDP per capita.

The city has two major ports: the Port of Vitória and the Port of Tubarão. These ports are part of the largest port complex of the country, which are considered the best in quality of Brazil. The city, which lies on the coast, is close to the mountains of Espírito Santo. Through the city's port authority, the city council also manages the Trindade and Martim Vaz islands, 1,100 kilometres (680 miles) off the coast, which are important meteorological bases because of their strategic position, they are located in an area of dispersion of air masses.

== Geography ==
Vitória is a city located on the southeastern coast of Brazil. It belongs to the state of Espírito Santo, with the role of the capital of the state. Its territory extends over 97.12 km^{2}, being one of the smallest cities in the state and the smallest among the 27 Brazilian capitals.

Located in Vitória Bay, it is divided between the mainland and the island of Vitória. The municipality has an outlet, to the east, to the Atlantic Ocean and borders three other municipalities: Serra, to the north, Cariacica to the west, and Vila Velha to the south. Together with them and the municipalities of Fundão, Guarapari and Viana, it forms the Metropolitan Region of Vitória, also called Greater Vitória.

The city of Vitória integrates the domain of the coastal plain. Its substrate is divided between an area of folds and another of sedimentary deposits, which gives it a very rugged relief composed of hills, some of them derived from residual forms, gently undulating terrains and plains. The city is part of the Atlantic Forest, a biome that extends along the eastern coast of Brazil, as well as part of the coastal-marine system. In this way, the plant cover of Espírito Santo is composed of tropical forests, mangroves, sandbanks and dune vegetation.

Two rivers are responsible for supplying the Metropolitan Region of Vitória: Santa Maria da Vitória river and Jucu river. The beaches that make up the coast of the city are the beaches of Camburi, Curva da Jurema and Castanheiras. The municipality of Vitória is composed of 80 neighborhoods, which are divided into nine different administrative regions:

- Centro
- Santo Antônio
- Jucutuquara
- Maruípe
- Praia do Canto
- Continental
- São Pedro
- Jardim Camburi
- Jardim da Penha

=== Relief ===
The relief of the islands is an extension of the continent, whether granite, surrounded by the sea and native Brazilian restinga-mangue vegetation. The central massif of the island of Vitória, Morro da Fonte Grande, has an altitude of 308.8 m and the main granitic outcrops are Pedra dos Dois Olhos, with 296m, and Morro de São Benedito, with 194m of altitude. Vitória's highest point is Pico do Desejado, located in the Trindade Island, with 601m of altitude, eleven hundred kilometers away from the mainland coastline.

=== Climate ===
Vitória

Climate chart (precipitation, max. and min. temperature)
J	F	M	A	M	J	J	A	S	O	N	D
77 32 24	54 32 24	87 32 24	72 30 23	46 29 21	43 28 19	46 27 19	45 27 19	51 27 20	76 28 22	143 29 23	175 30 24
- █ Average max. and min. temperatures in °C
- █ Precipitation totals in mm
- Source: MSN Weather
Imperial conversion
J	F	M	A	M	J	J	A	S	O	N	D
3 90 75	2.1 90 75	3.4 90 75	2.8 86 73	1.8 84 70	1.7 82 66	1.8 81 66	1.8 81 66	2 81 68	3 82 72	5.6 84 73	6.9 86 75
- █ Average max. and min. temperatures in °F
- █ Precipitation totals in inches

The city's climate is tropical, with average annual temperature of 23 °C (73 °F) and the occurrence of rainfall specially in the months from October to January. Temperatures can vary greatly in winter and can reach 30 °C (86 °F) in times of drought but 12 °C (54 °F) when cold fronts occur followed by an abnormally cold temperature of the ocean.

The highest absolute maximum temperature ever recorded in the city is 39.6 °C (103.3 °F) (INMET) on February 25, 2006, and the minimum is less than 9 °C (48 °F), which resulted from the cold Falklands oceanic current.

Vitória shares the position of the Brazilian capital with the lowest rates of rainfall with Rio de Janeiro at approximately 918 millimetres (36.1 in) annually. Vitória is also the city that presents the lowest temperature range in practically the whole state of Espírito Santo, as a result both of its oceanic climate and the protection that the mountains afford from major weather changes influenced by air masses.

Vitória is one of the hottest cities in the state of Espírito Santo, due to atmospherical pollution and the large cluster of buildings, in addition to several mountains on the island, which block the south wind, which traditionally occurs on cold days in the state. This causes the minimum of the city being 2 °C (3.6 °F) warmer than the average in the state.

Another contributing factor is that the level of rainfall in the city is lesser than Espírito Santo's average as a whole, by about 350 millimetres (13.8 in). This thermal variation can be easily noticed by comparing the temperatures of Vitória with the nearby town of Vila Velha, noted in all seasons, specially in winter, the minimum of Vila Velha is 1 °C (34 °F), 3 °C (5.4 °F) lower than in Vitória.

Climate data for Vitória (1991–2020)
Month	Jan	Feb	Mar	Apr	May	Jun	Jul	Aug	Sep	Oct	Nov	Dec	Year
Mean daily maximum °C (°F)	31.4 (88.5)	32.0 (89.6)	31.4 (88.5)	30.1 (86.2)	28.2 (82.8)	27.4 (81.3)	26.7 (80.1)	26.9 (80.4)	27.4 (81.3)	28.3 (82.9)	28.7 (83.7)	30.3 (86.5)	29.1 (84.3)
Daily mean °C (°F)	27.1 (80.8)	27.5 (81.5)	27.1 (80.8)	24.0 (75.2)	23.1 (73.6)	22.5 (72.5)	22.6 (72.7)	22.6 (72.7)	23.4 (74.1)	24.4 (75.9)	25.0 (77.0)	26.3 (79.3)	24.6 (76.3)
Mean daily minimum °C (°F)	24.1 (75.4)	24.4 (75.9)	24.0 (75.2)	22.9 (73.2)	21.1 (70.0)	20.1 (68.2)	19.6 (67.3)	19.7 (67.5)	20.5 (68.9)	21.5 (70.7)	22.2 (72.0)	23.3 (73.9)	22.0 (71.5)
Average precipitation mm (inches)	131.2 (5.17)	79.4 (3.13)	139.5 (5.49)	122.9 (4.84)	92.4 (3.64)	70.0 (2.76)	67.5 (2.66)	59.9 (2.36)	63.1 (2.48)	123.9 (4.88)	233.6 (9.20)	201.0 (7.91)	1,384.4 (54.52)
Average rainy days (≥ 1.0 mm)	8.7	7.2	9.4	8.4	7.1	6.6	7.3	7.3	7.6	9.2	12.3	11.2	102.3
Average dew point °C (°F)	22.4 (72.3)	22.7 (72.9)	22.8 (73.0)	21.9 (71.4)	19.9 (67.8)	19.2 (66.6)	18.4 (65.1)	18.3 (64.9)	18.9 (66.0)	20.0 (68.0)	21.0 (69.8)	22.1 (71.8)	20.6 (69.1)
Mean monthly sunshine hours	210.8	218.9	206.6	184.0	187.1	184.3	186.8	196.6	166.5	165.5	140.2	167.6	2,214.9
Mean daily daylight hours	13.2	12.8	12.2	11.6	11.1	10.9	11.0	12.4	12.0	12.6	13.1	13.3	12.2
Average ultraviolet index	15	14	13	11	8	7	8	10	12	13	14	15	12
Source 1: NOAA
Source 2: Weather atlas(Daylight) Nomadseason(Average daily maximum UV)

== History ==
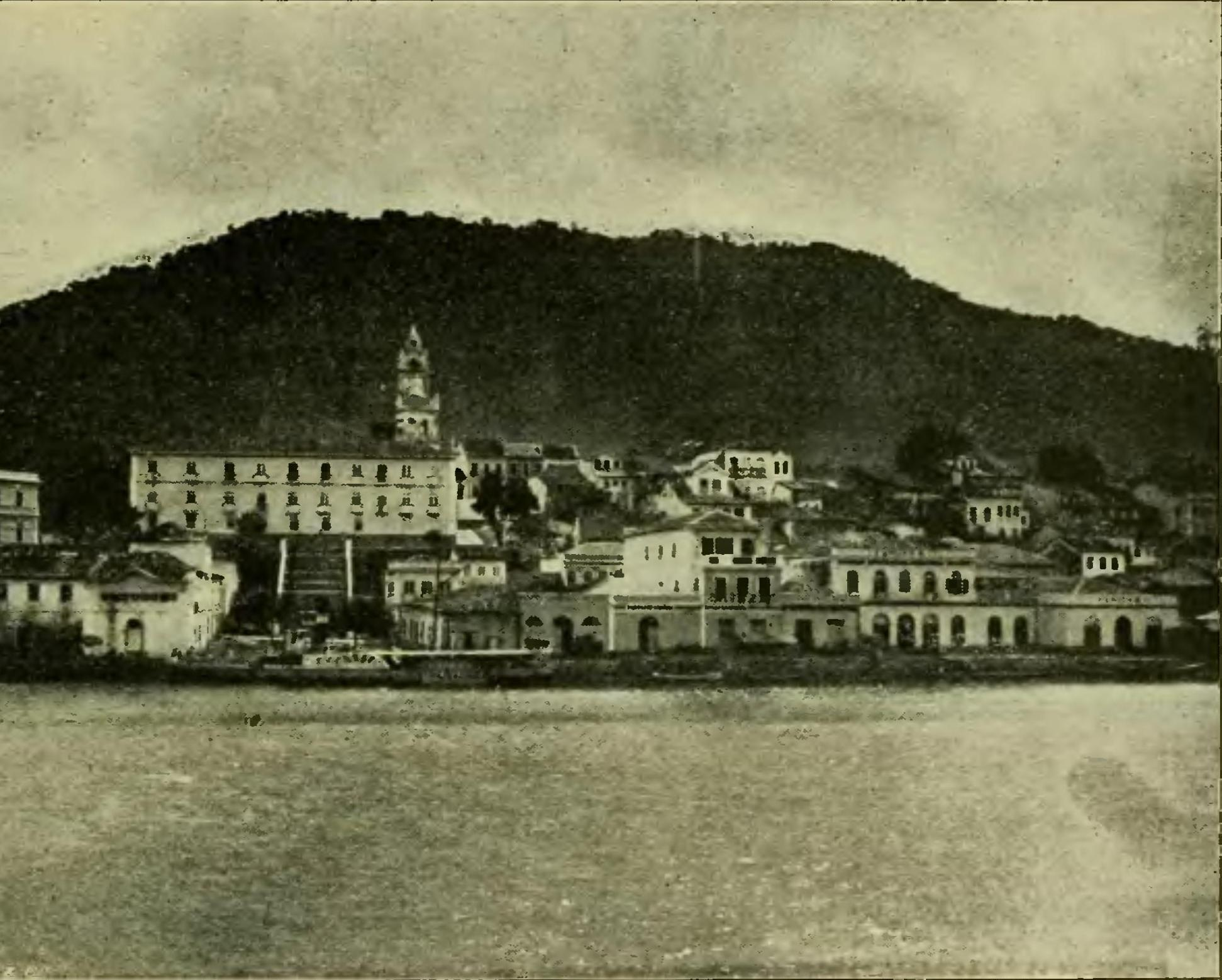
View of Vitória in 1903.

Vila Velha, which was the capital of the Captaincy of Espírito Santo, found itself in constant attacks from the Tupi-Guarani-speaking and possibly some Macro-Jê-speaking indigenous peoples and the French and Dutch. The Portuguese then decided to move away the capital and chose an island near the mainland, called by some of the native peoples Guanaani Island. Vila Nova do Espírito Santo, as it was called, was founded on September 8, 1551, and later renamed Vitória in memory of the victory in a great battle led by the holder of the captaincy, Vasco Fernandes Coutinho, against Goytacaz Amerindians.

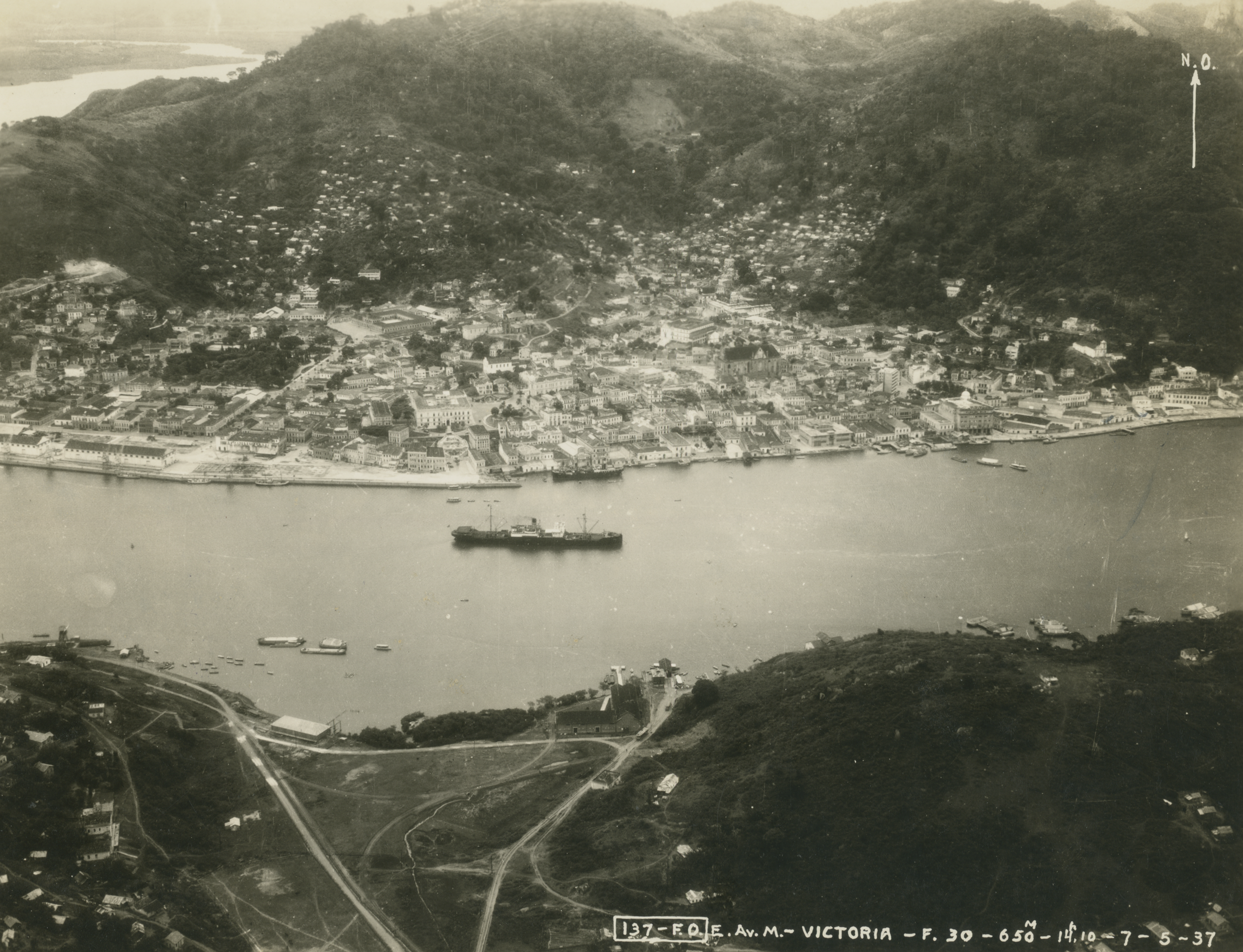
Vitória, 1937. National Archives of Brazil.

Until the last century, the limits of the current capital of Espírito Santo were Fort São João, where is currently located the Club de Regatas Saldanha da Gama, near the city center, and the hill where sits the actual Santa Casa de Misericórdia hospital, in Vila Rubim. The city was built on the highlands, which originated several narrow streets. The lowlands were under attack and because of that a number of fortresses were built in the coastline.

On February 24, 1823, the town of Vitória became a city, but its insular isolation prevented its development. From 1894 on, many landfills were implemented in the lower parts of the city with the coffee cycle, changing the shape of the island and urbanising it. Several new neighbourhoods were thus inhabited and public steps built to connect them with the higher ground and ancient houses were demolished. Moreover, sanitation was improved. In 1927, the bridge that connected the island to the mainland was opened and it was followed in 1941 by the first harbour pier.

The port had an important development. Wide avenues were opened over landfills. With these changes, the city became the largest urban space of State of Espírito Santo, a metropolis. In 1970, the Vitória Harbour rose to one of the most important in the country, and the city began its industrialization process. The modernization of the island led to the disappearance of almost all traces of the Colonial and Imperial Brazilian epochs.

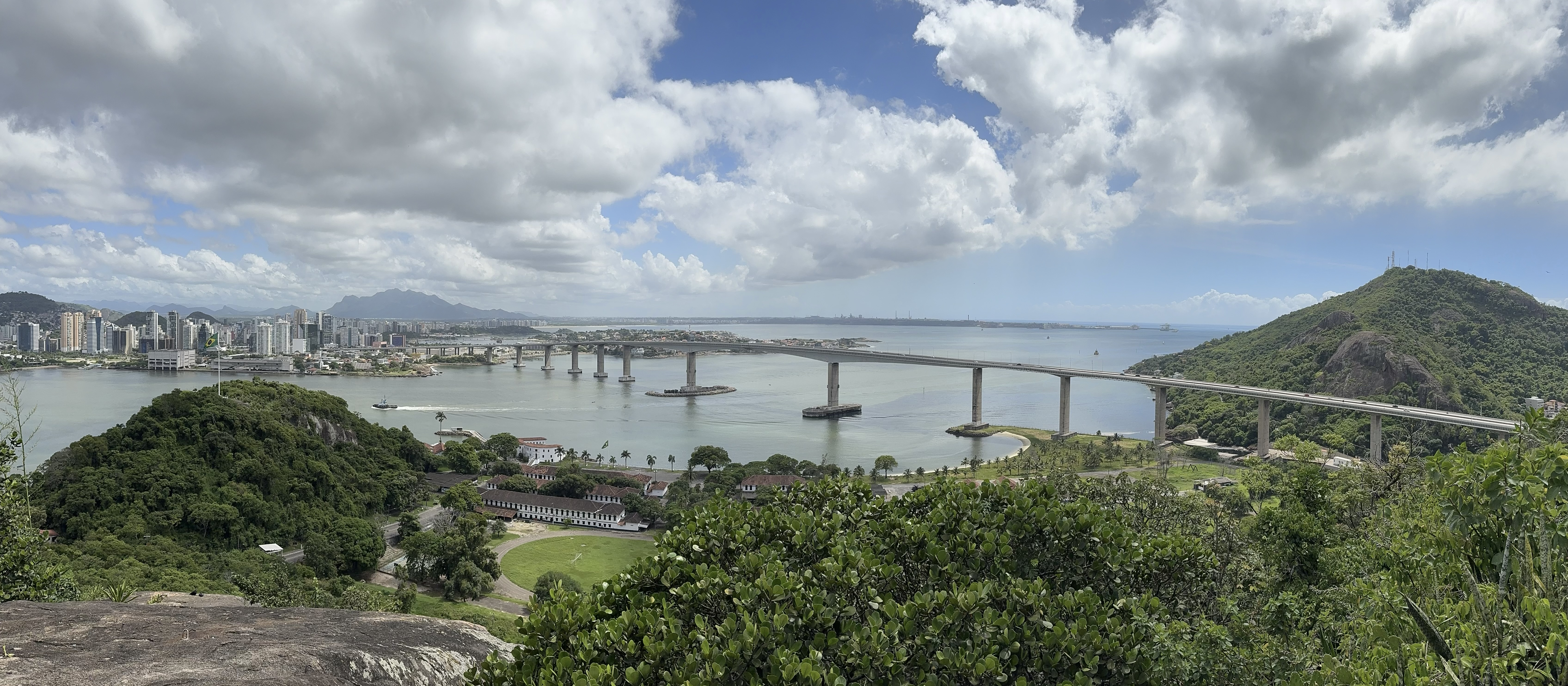
Panoramic view of the Vitória bay as seen from the Penha Convent.

== Demographics ==
Race and ethnicity in Vitória
Ethnicity	Percentage
White	45.6%
Pardo (Multiracial)	41.6%
Black	12.4%
Asian	0.2%
Amerindian	0.2%

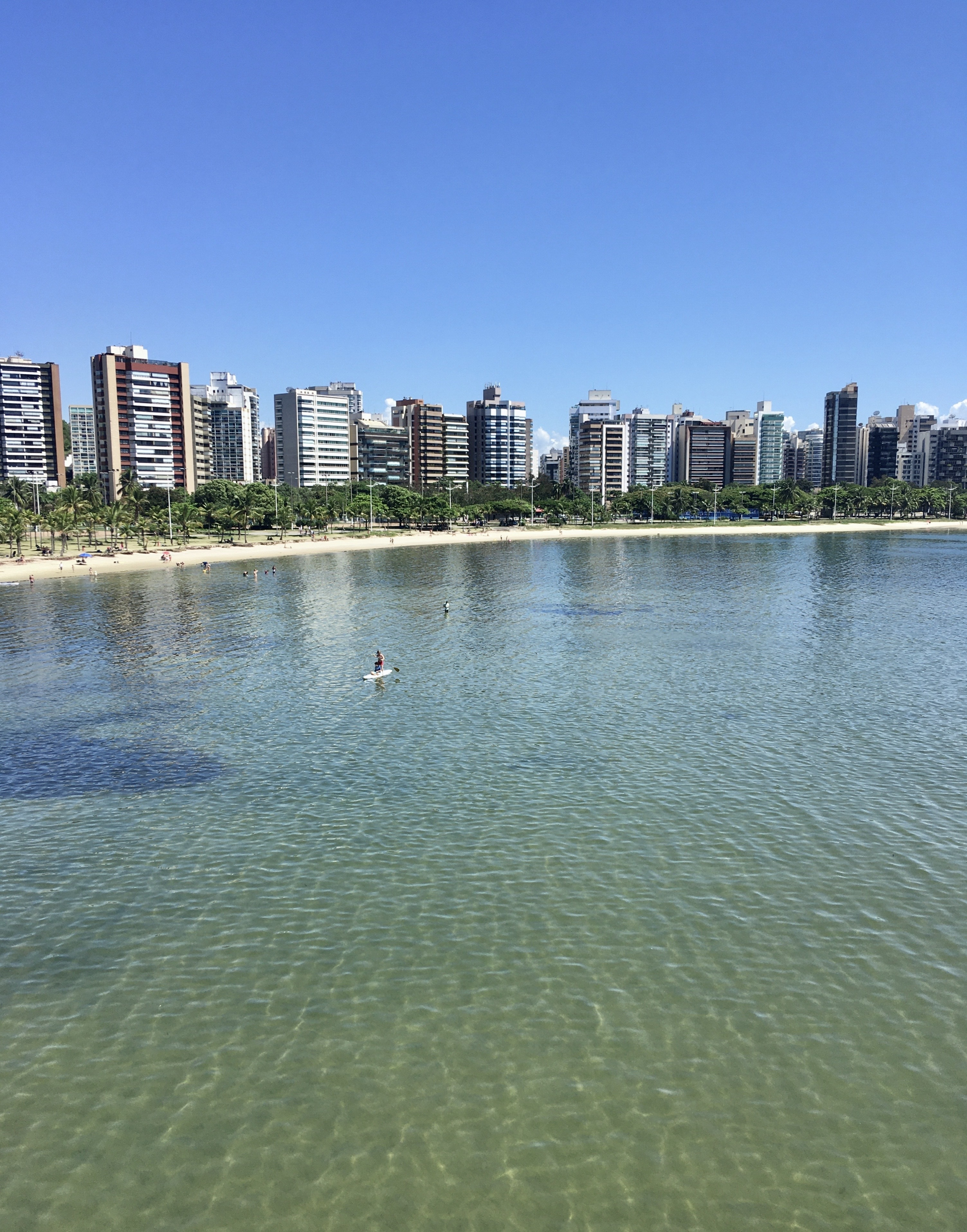
Vitoria bay.

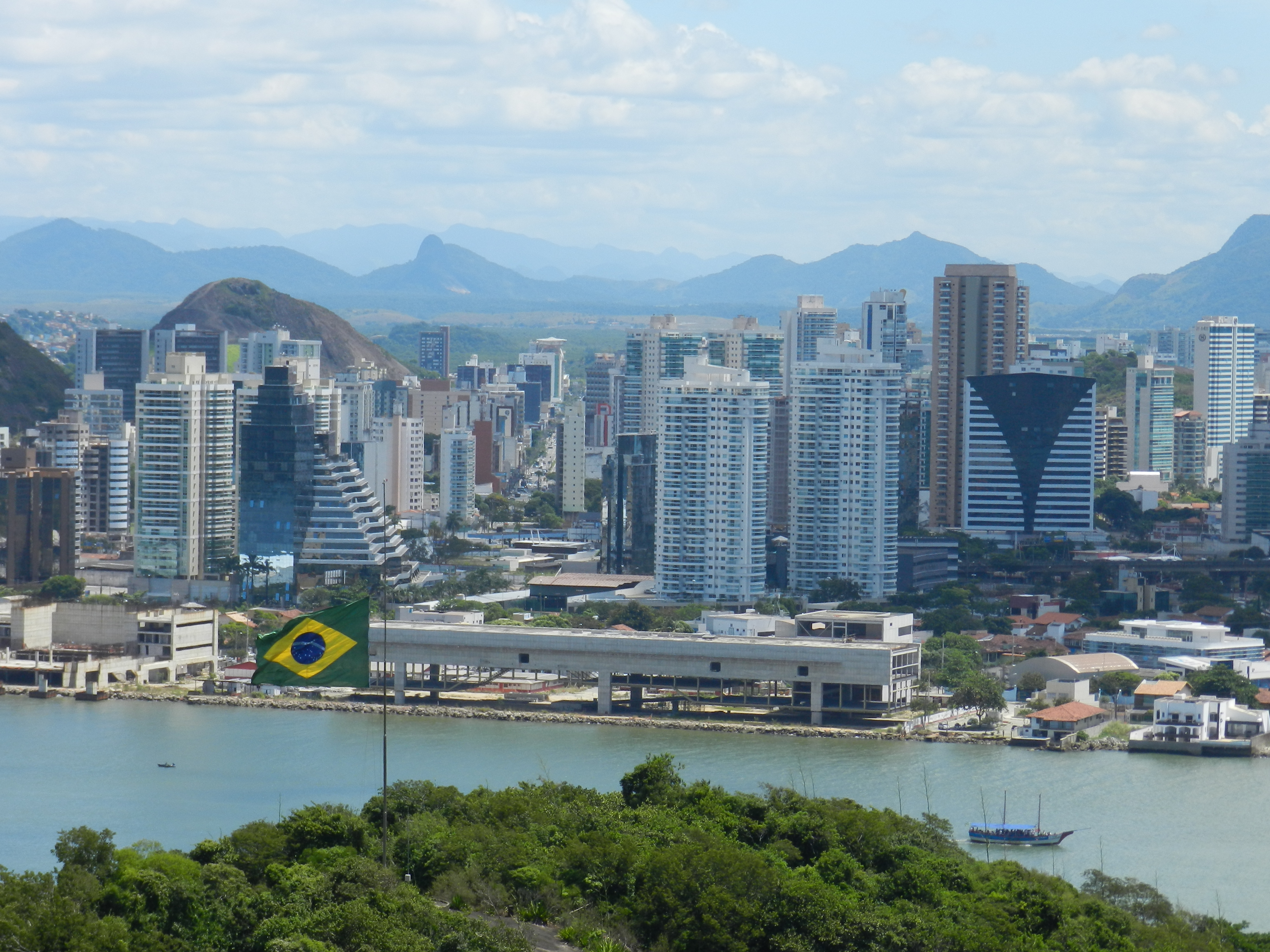
View of Vitória from Convento da Penha.

According to the IBGE of 2022, there were 322,869 people residing in the city. The racial makeup of the city was 45.6% White, 41.6% Pardo (Multiracial), 12.4% Black, 0.2% Asian, and 0.2% Amerindian.

Vitória is the second Brazilian capital with the best quality of life, according to research at the Getúlio Vargas Foundation. This same research institution also claims that Vitória is the 9th best city in Brazil to work in. The capital of Espírito Santo has the highest per capita income among the capitals of Brazil.

- GDP per capita (2007): 60592.00 (1st place among the capitals)
- Life Expectancy (years) at birth: 70.74 (4th place among the capitals)
- IDHM R-index of income: 0.858 (3rd position among the capitals)
- IDHM E-Education Index: 0.948 (3rd position among the capitals)
- IDHM-L Index Longevity: .762 (4th place among the capital)
- ICH index of deprivation in the Provision of Essential Services Housing: 0.882
- Adult literacy rate: 95.48% (5th position among the capitals)
- Average ENEM 2007: 60.225 (1st place among the capitals of Brazil)
- Gross rate of school attendance: 93.36% (3rd position among the capitals)
- Gini Index : 0.61
- Highest HDI between the capitals of the Southeast and third largest among the capital (0.856)
- Number of voters: 237 554
- Annual population growth rate: 2.36%
- Best capital for young start career
- Ninth best city to work
- Vitória Airport is the 14th in passenger movement in Brazil, and it embarked or disembarked 1,661,192 passengers in 2006. It is the 14th in cargo, and transported 13,023,544 kilograms in 2006.
- Vitória has the largest port in handling a ton of Brazil
- Fleet of vehicles: 120,826
- Smaller population of the capitals of Southeastern

=== Religion ===
Catholicism is the most widely practiced religion in Vitória, as well as throughout Espírito Santo, and holds the greatest political and social influence. Our Lady of Penha is considered by Catholics to be the patron saint of Espírito Santo. In her honor, an annual pilgrimage named Romaria dos Homens takes place, starting at the Metropolitan Cathedral of Vitória and ending at Penha Convent in Vila Velha. Among the city's main Catholic churches are the Chapel of Santa Luzia (built in the 16th century, the oldest building in the municipality); the Church of São Gonçalo (built in 1766 by the Brotherhoods of Our Lady of Amparo and Good Death); the Church of the Rosary (listed as a historical heritage site, built in the 18th century); the Church and Convent of Carmo (founded in 1682 by the Carmelite priests); the Basilica-Sanctuary of Santo Antônio (built in the 1960s by the Pavonian priests); and the Metropolitan Cathedral of Vitória, whose construction began in the 1920s.

Religion	Percentage	Number
Catholic	63.36%	185,211
Protestant	22.18%	64,846
No religion	10.53%	30,791
Spiritist	2.04%	5,975

Source: IBGE 2000

== Economy ==
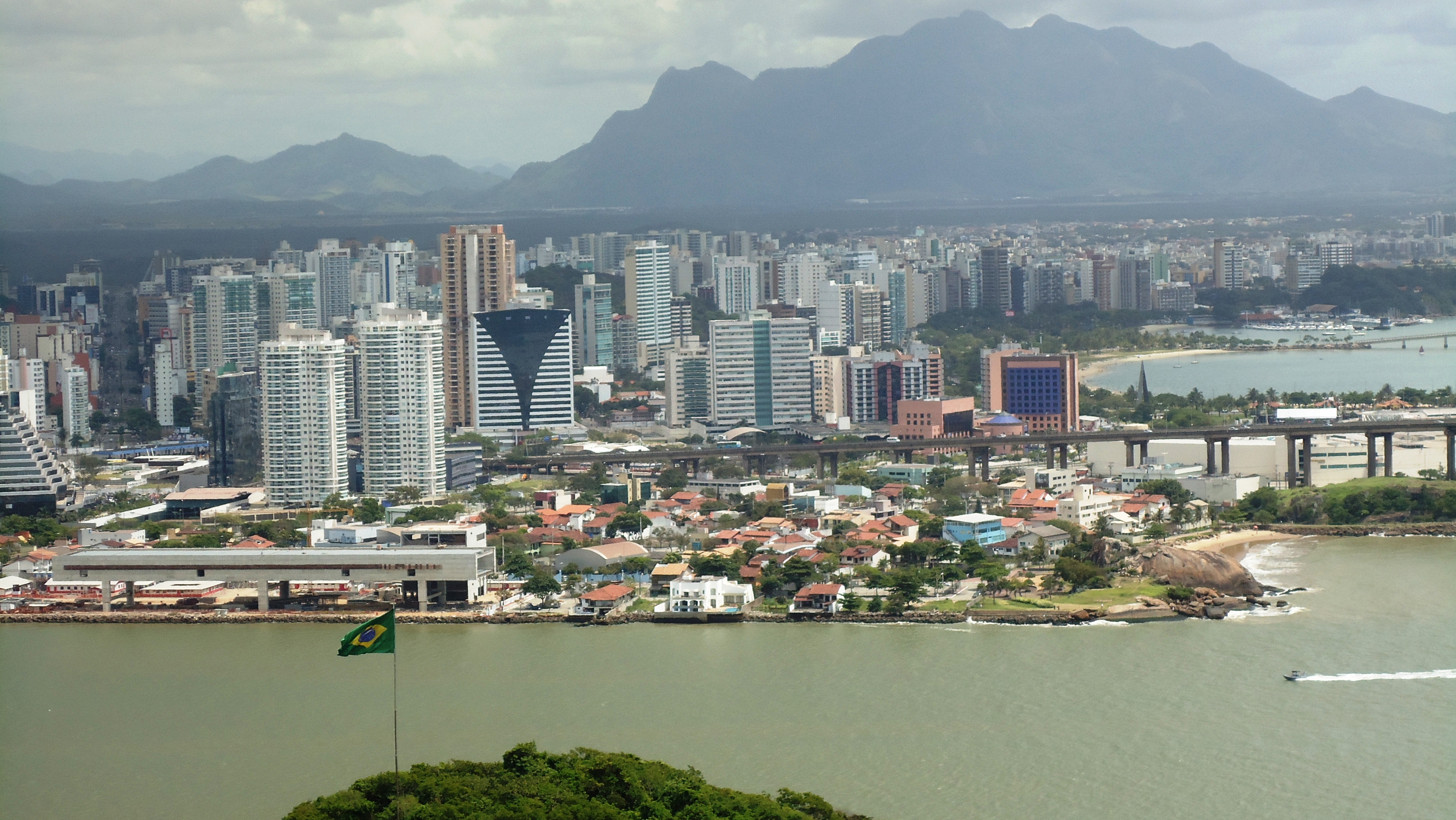
View of Enseada do Suá from above Vila Velha.

Vitória's economy is based on port activities, active trade, industry, and also providing services to tourism. The capital of Espírito Santo has two ports that are the most important of the country: Port of Vitória and the Port of Tubarão. The most important industries are global steelmaker ArcelorMittal Tubarão (formerly CST) and mining company Vale (formerly Companhia Vale do Rio Doce, CVRD).

Vitória's GDP corresponds to 20% of the state economy. The tertiary sector encompasses most of the economy of Vitória, reaching 60% of the value of the local economy. This amount does not include local public administration. The calculation covers commerce and services. Industry accounts for 30% of Vitória's economy, housing large companies in the extractive sectors, such as Petrobras.

=== Trade ===
The main shopping center in Vitória is the Shopping Vitória, featuring over 400 shops, a large food court and a cineplex. There is also the Shopping Norte Sul, with 99 stores, the Shopping Centro da Praia, Shopping Boulevard, among others.

== Education ==
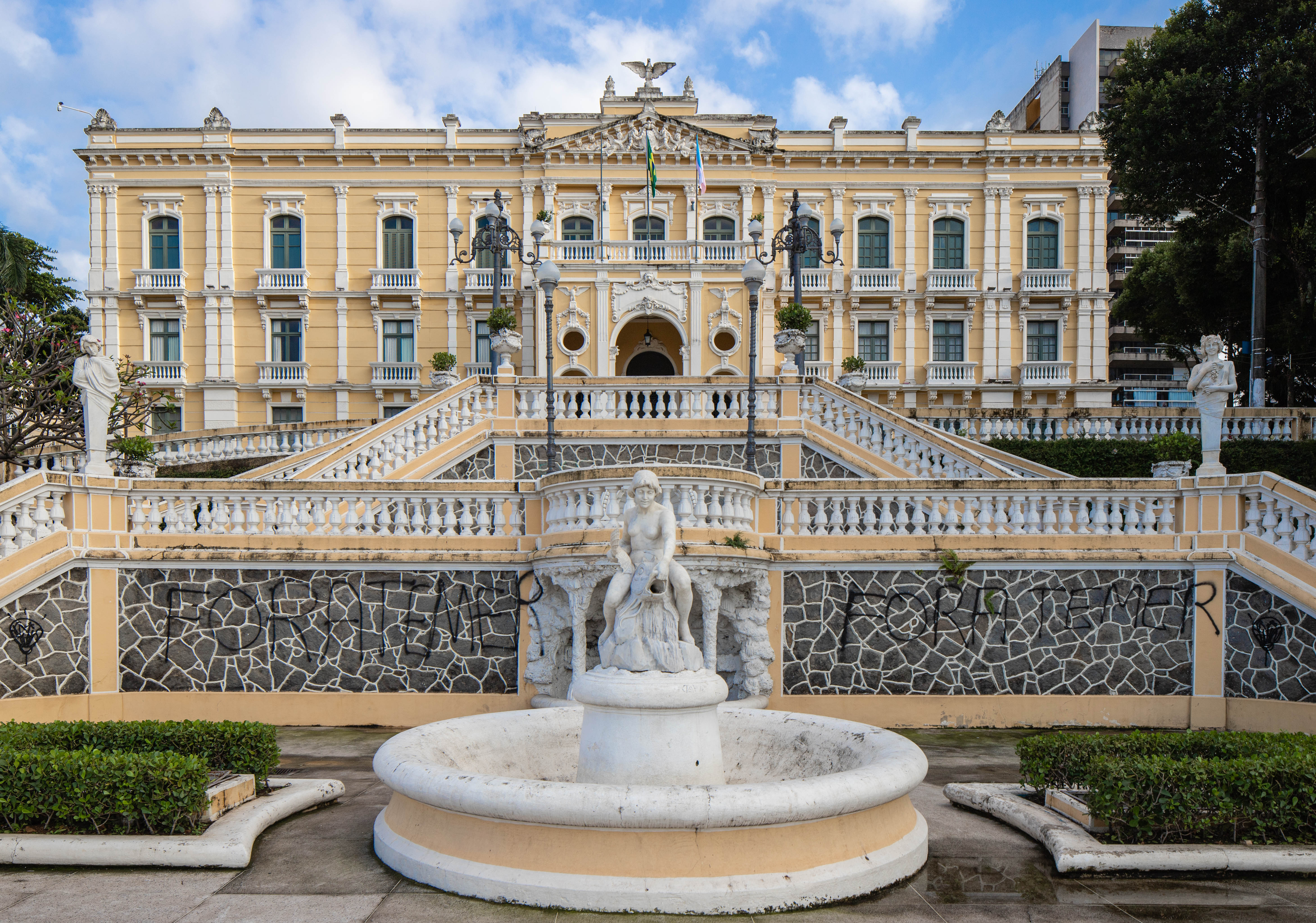
Anchieta Palace in Vitória.

Portuguese is the official national language, and thus the primary language taught in schools. A secondary language is also required as part of the official curriculum for both elementary schools and high school. The second most taught language is English, followed by Spanish, French and Italian.

Curiously, within the state of Espírito Santo, the German language (especially the East Pomeranian variety) has probably as many speakers as the French and Italian languages, although it is not available as part of the official curriculum in most schools.

=== Educational institutions ===
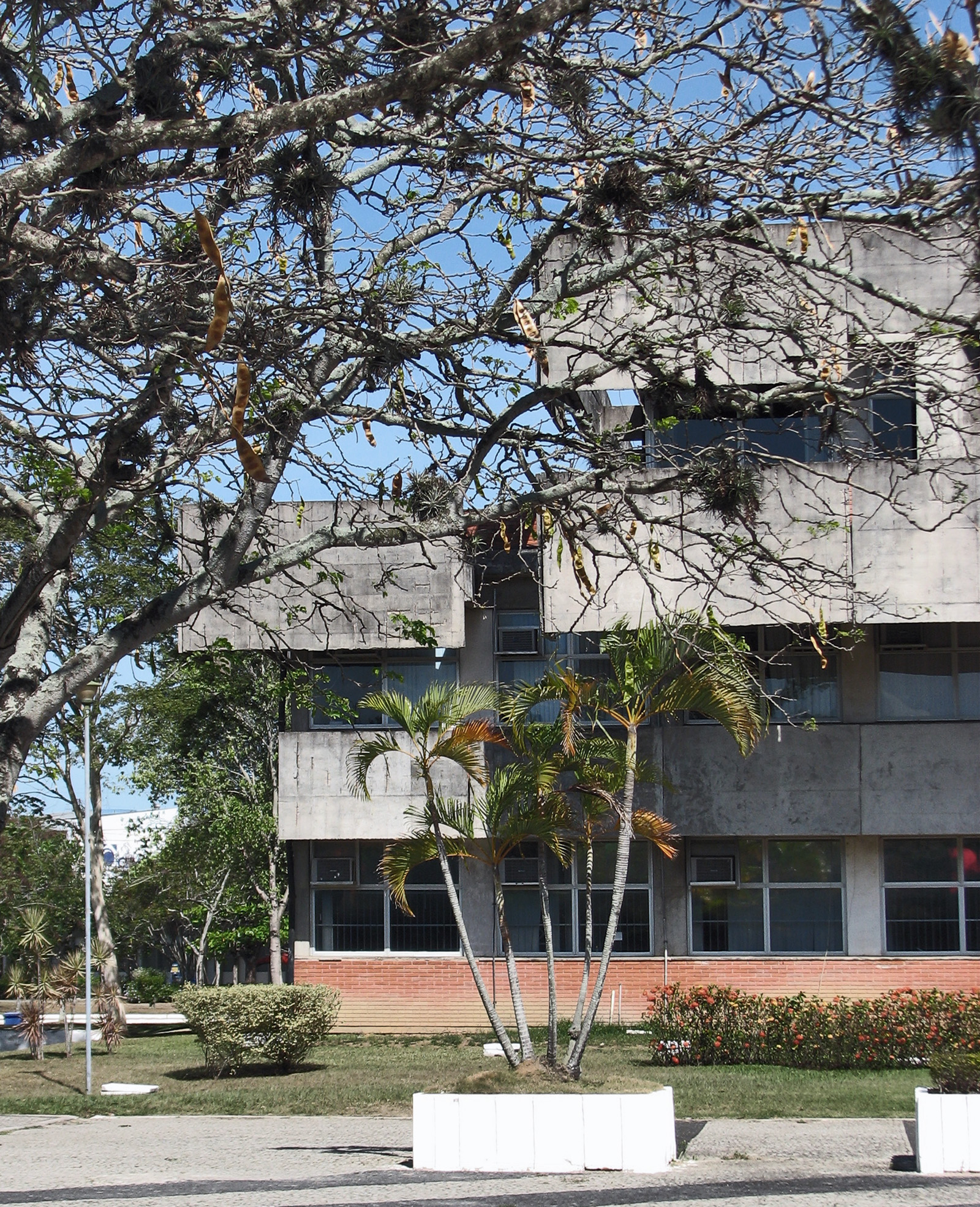
Federal University of Espírito Santo.

- Universidade Federal do Espírito Santo (UFES)
- Instituto Federal de Educação, Ciência e Tecnologia do Espírito Santo (IFES) – a.k.a. Centro Federal de Educação Tecnológica do Espírito Santo (CEFET-ES) / Escola Técnica Federal do Espírito Santo (ETFES)
- Universidade Vila Velha (UVV)
- Escola Superior de Ciências da Santa Casa de Misericórdia de Vitória (Emescam)
- Faculdade de Música do Espírito Santo (FAMES)
- Centro Universitário Multivix Vitória (Multivix)
- Faculdade Cândido Mendes de Vitória (FCMV)
- Faculdades Integradas Espírito-Santenses (FAESA)
- Faculdades Integradas de Vitória (FDV)
- Faculdade Estácio de Sá de Vitória (Fesv)
- Associação Vitoriana de Ensino Superior (Favi)
- Faculdade Metropolitana de Vitória (Metropolitana)
- Faculdade Batista de Vitória (Fabavi)
- Faculdade de Ciências Econômicas de Vitória (Facev)
- Fundação Capixaba de Pesquisa em Economia, Contabilidade e Finanças (FUCAPE Business)

It formerly hosted the Vitória Japanese School (ヴィトリア日本人学校 Vitoria Nihonjin Gakkō), a Japanese international school.

== Transportation ==
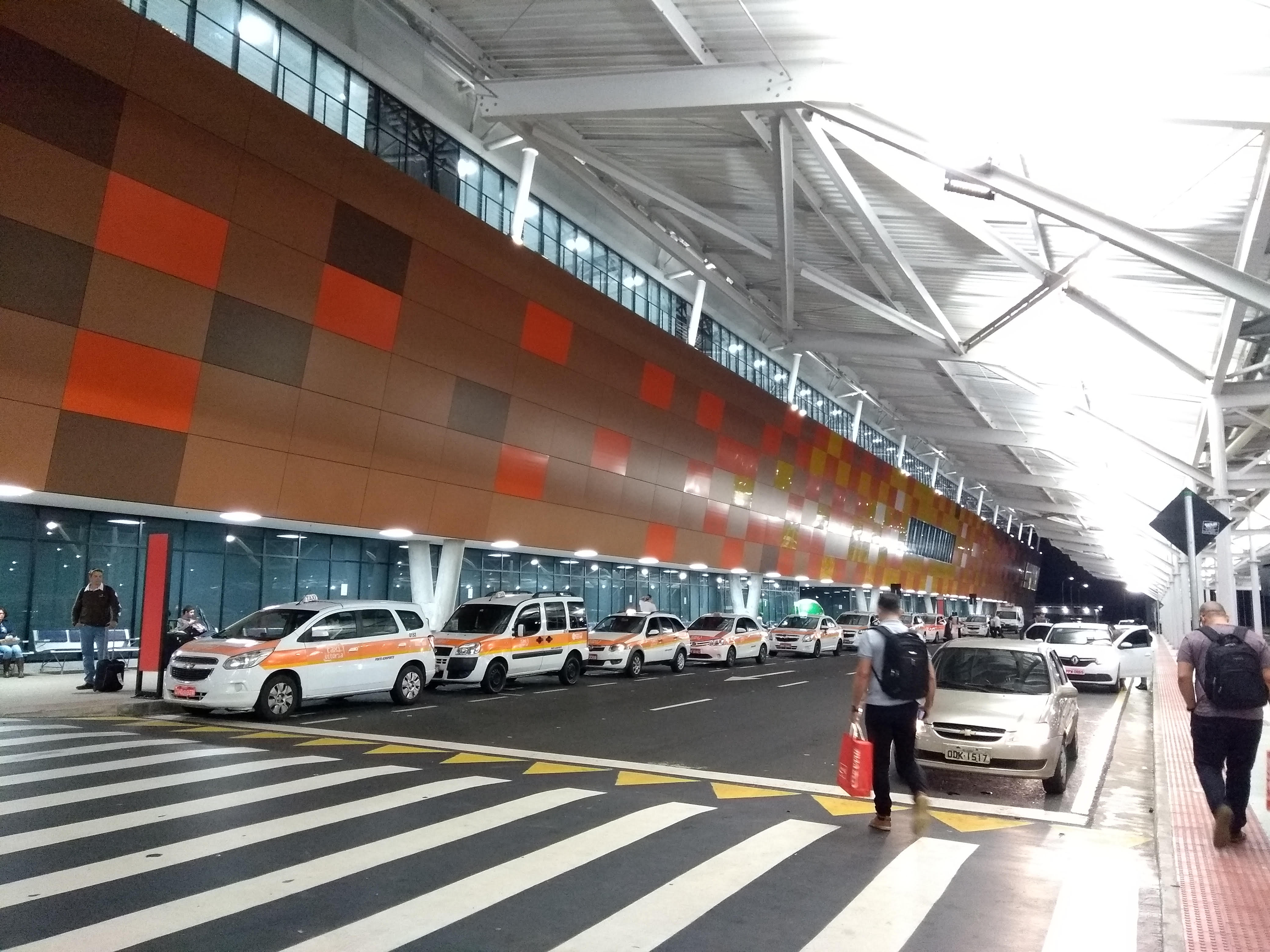
Vitória International Airport.

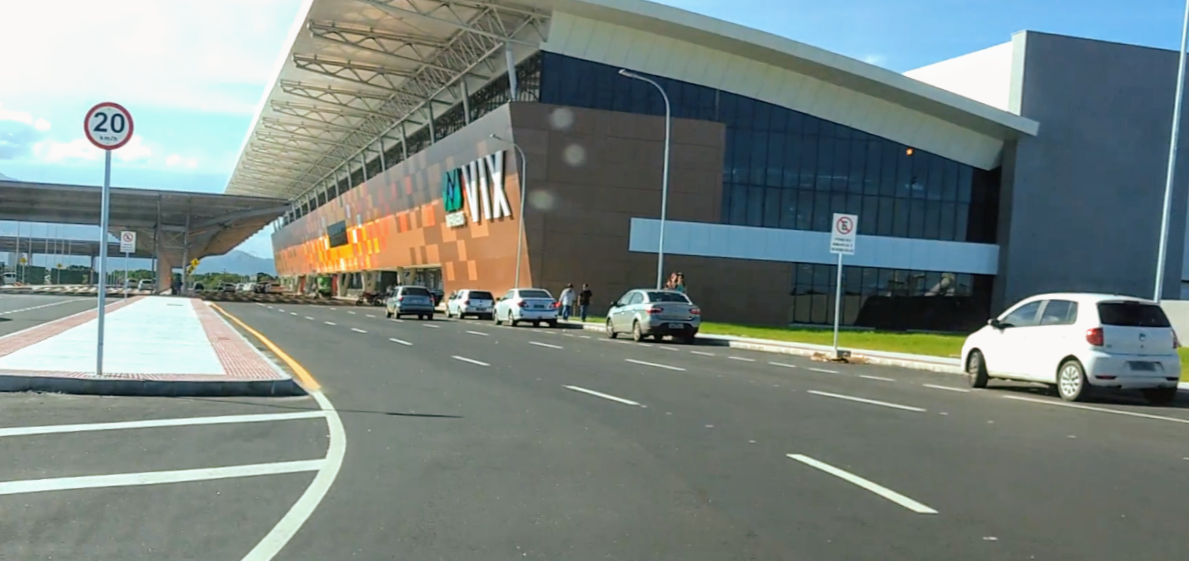
Entrance of VIX Airport.

=== Airport ===
Eurico de Aguiar Salles Airport (Goiabeiras) is located on a land plot of just over 5.2 million square meters. Since construction of its first step, finished in 1946, Vitória Airport has undergone several expansions and modernizations, but current demand has surpassed its capacity of 2.9 million passengers a year. The passenger terminal is air conditioned, with a constructed area of nearly 17,000 square meters, a check-in concourse, 25 check-in counters and boarding and arrival lounges. The recent construction of new aircraft parking boxes on the aprons has improved the airport's operational efficiency.

In 2012, more than 3.7 million passengers used the airport, and in 2013 this rose to almost 4 million. Vitória is one of the 32 airports in the Infraero network that has a cargo terminal. In May 1999, the first direct international freight connection started between Vitoria and the United States (Miami) began operating to Vitória, facilitating imports to the state of Espírito Santo. Today there are five such flights a week.

=== Public Transportation ===
Vitoria has two urban transportation systems.

- The first one, which only works in the city, known by the locals as "verdinhos" because the colors of the bus, the municipal fleet is divided into three bus companies operating 52 conventional lines and 2 selective lines with air conditioning. The passages payment system is electronic ticketing and has service in all districts of the city.
- The Transcol system, linking the capital to other cities of Vitoria, and the lines run along major corridors such as Victoria Av and Beira Mar Av. Some neighborhoods of the city, get out of the axes of the main avenues have specific lines, as Jardim Camburi, which is linked to the Carapina Terminal and Laranjeiras, in the municipality of Serra, through 800 and the Grande Sao Pedro and Grande Santo Antonio line, which are served by lines 518 and 535 and connected to Ibes terminals (Vila Velha) Jardim America (Cariacica), Campo Grande (Cariacica) and Carapina (Serra). It features integration system through bus terminals that are scattered strategic points of the metropolitan area. The state capital, however, no longer has the Transcol system terminals since the closure of the Terminal Don Bosco in 2009.

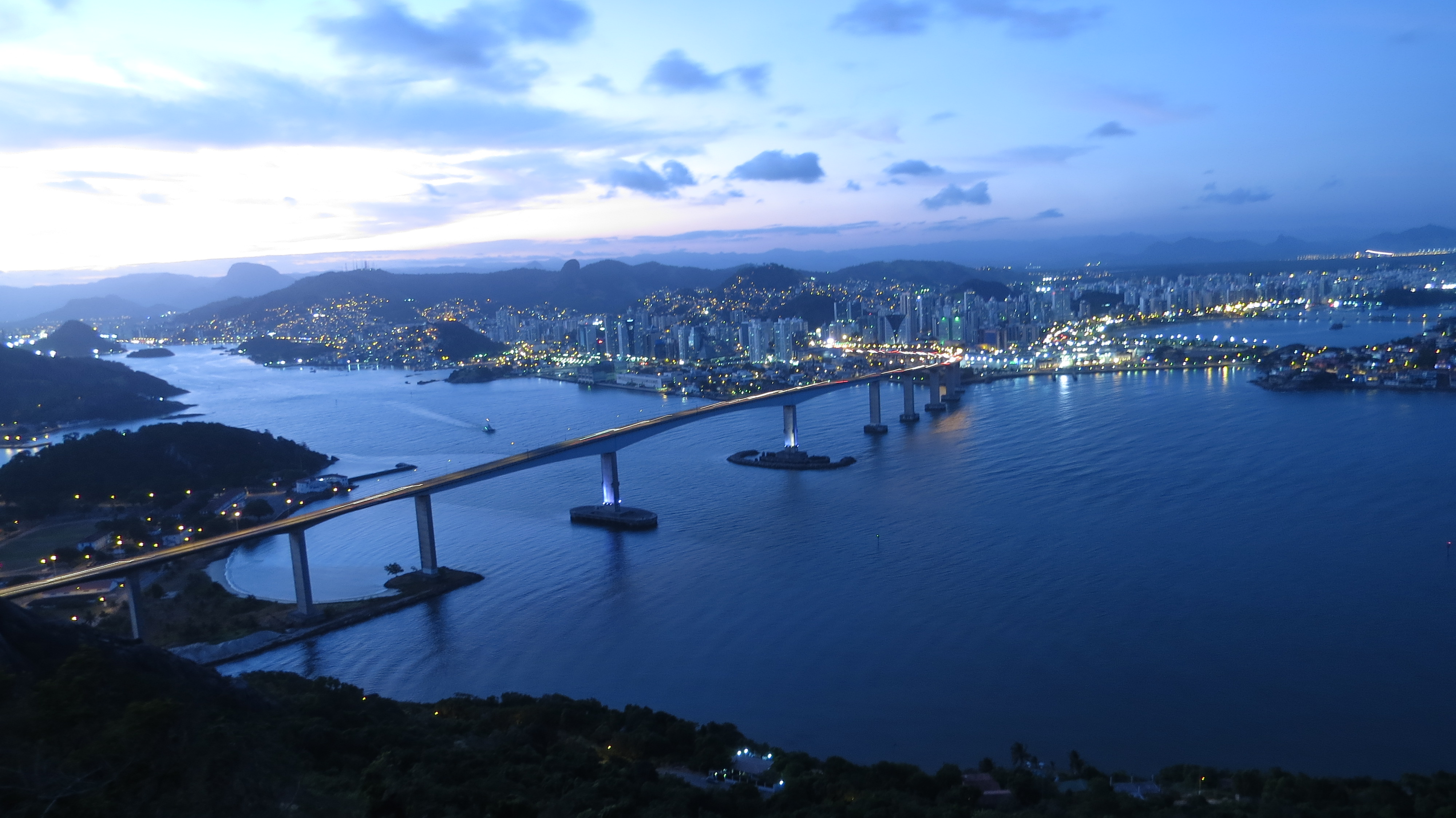
Aerial view of Vitória bay.

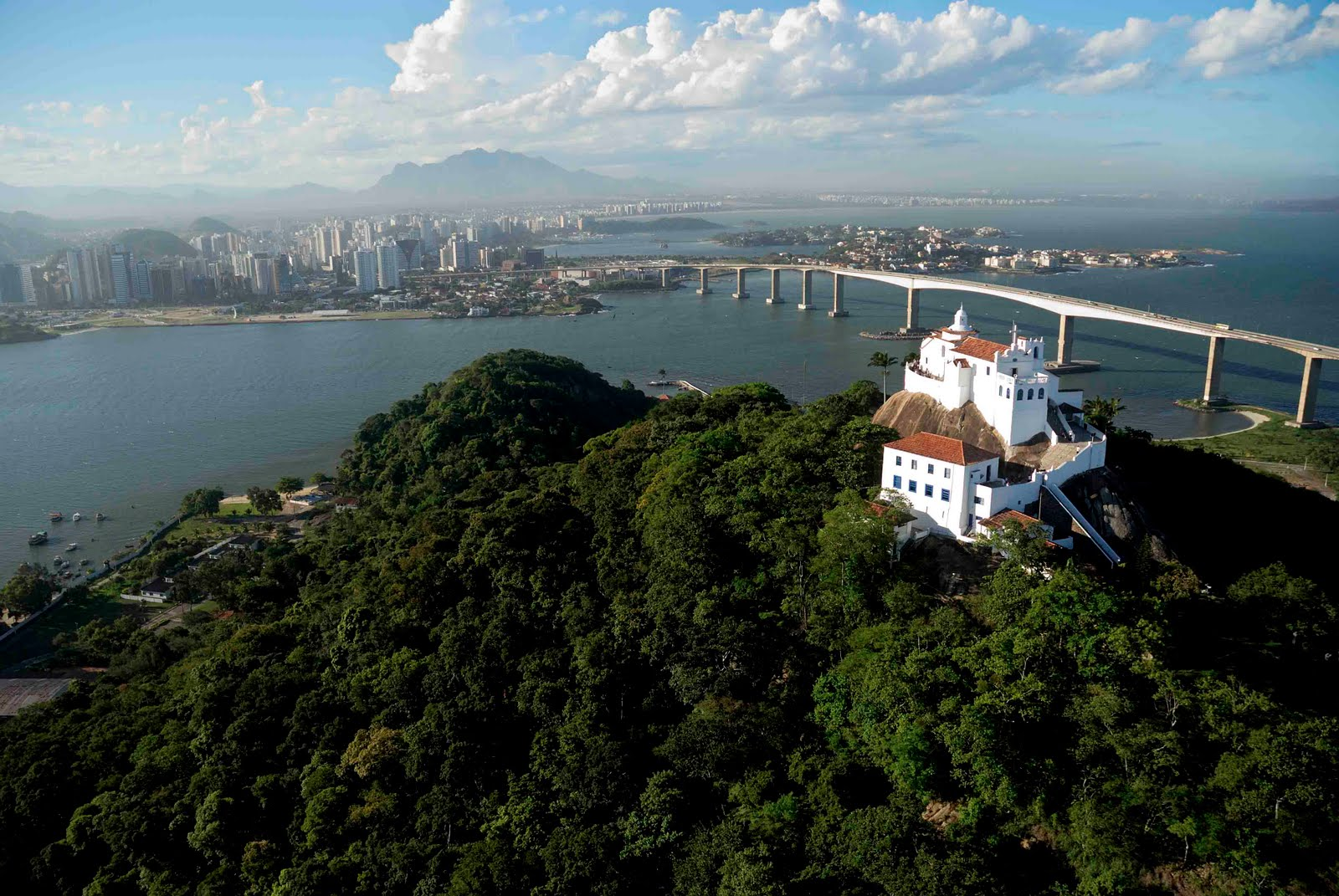
Bay and bridge.

=== Highways ===
The main access roads are the BR-101, a motorway linking the Brazilian south and northeast with the Metropolitan Region of Greater Vitória, the BR-262 that connects the Central region with Vitória and the Rodovia do Sol (Sun Motorway). Aside from the national highways, the ES-060 runs through the city, which links the local coastal regions.

=== Ports ===
The city has two ports: the Port of Vitória and the Port do Tubarão.

The Port of Vitória is the most difficult port for ships to access in all of Brazil. The Bay of Vitória is extremely narrow, with rocks and hills that complicate access by freighters and maritime cruisers to the docks. Ships, cars, and people all compete for space. There are restrictions on traffic, limiting the use of the port. Currently, the port is mostly used by cruise ships and for the repair of ships and oil platforms.

The Port of Tubarão was designed in the 1960s by Companhia Vale do Rio Doce when the Port of Vitória began showing signs of saturation. It offers much easier access to the sea. Since its opening in 1966, its capacity has gradually increased, reaching 80 million tonnes/year in the last decade. Although originally created to export iron ore, in recent years, it has added silos for storing grains and soybean meal. The port is located at one end of Camburi Beach.

=== Railways ===
The Vitória-Minas Railway, which carries cargo from the Central Region, also carries passengers from Vitória to Belo Horizonte.

=== Bridge ===
The Deputy Darcy Castelo de Mendonça Bridge, also known as the Third Bridge (Portuguese: Terceira Ponte), is the second tallest bridge in Brazil, connecting and reducing the distance between the cities of Vila Velha and Vitória.

== Sports ==
=== Football ===
There are four professional football teams in the city, Rio Branco Atlético Clube, usually known simply as Rio Branco, Vitória Futebol Clube (ES), usually known simply as Vitória (or as Vitória-ES), Espírito Santo Futebol Clube, usually known simply as Espírito Santo, Doze Futebol Clube, usually known simply as Doze, currently playing in Campeonato Capixaba first level.

== International relations ==
=== Twin towns – sister cities ===
- Beirut, Lebanon
- Cascais, Portugal
- Dunkirk, France
- Havana, Cuba
- Mantua, Italy
- Miami, Florida, United States
- Ōita, Japan
- Vila Velha, Brazil
- Vitoria-Gasteiz, Spain
- Zhuhai, China
- Qingdao, China
- Mobile, Alabama, United States
- Iquique, Chile

== Historic structures ==
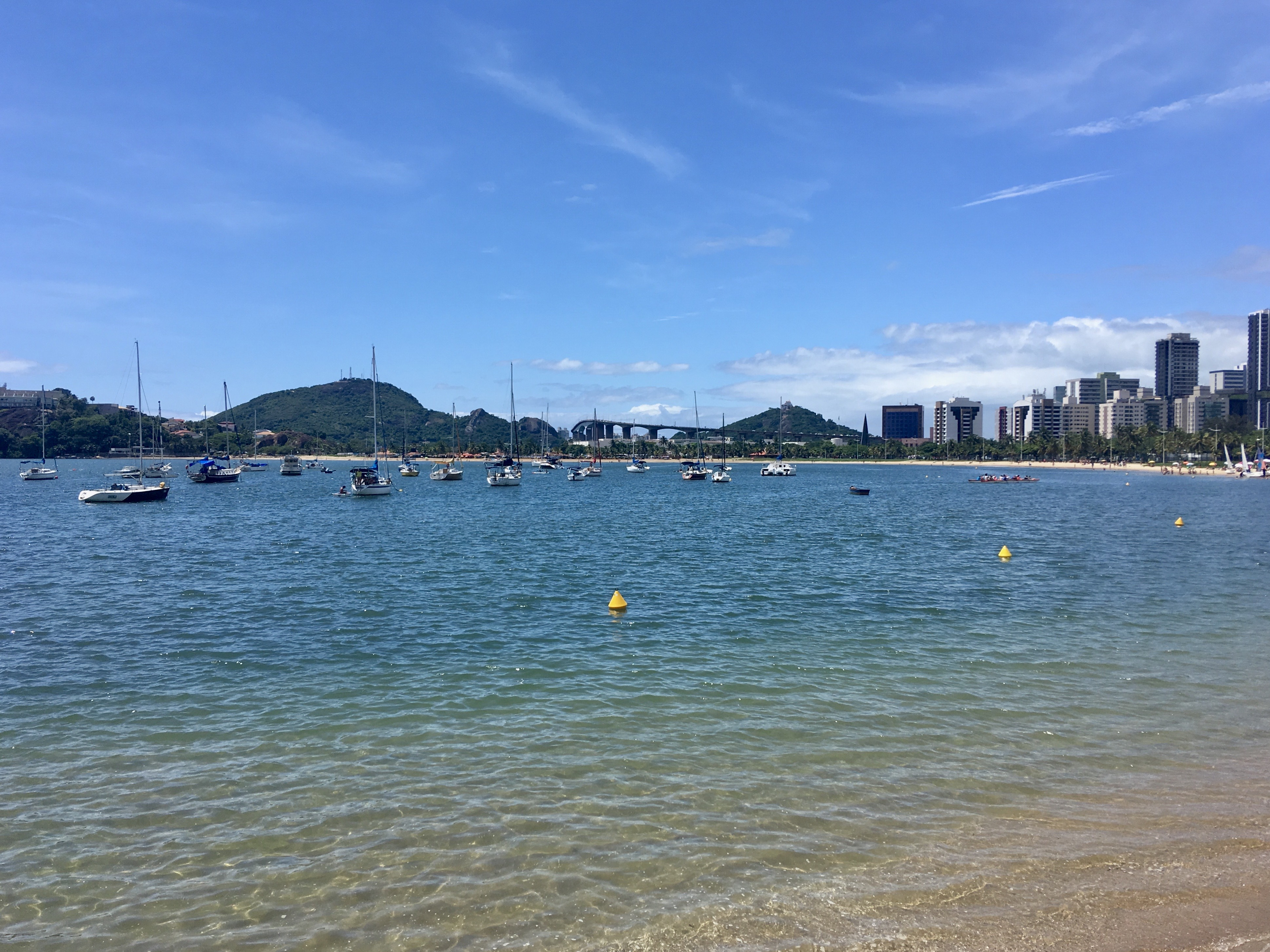
A view of Vitória bay.

Vitória is home to numerous colonial-period and imperial-period historic structures, many designated as federal, state, or municipal monuments.

- Carlos Gomes Theatre (Teatro Carlos Gomes)
- Our Lady of Victory Cathedral, Vitória (Catedral Metropolitana)
- Old Town Houses (Cidade Velha)
- Costa Pereira Square (Praça Costa Pereira)
- Chapel of Saint Lucy (Capela de Santa Luzia)
- São Gonçalo Church (Igreja de São Gonçalo)
- Caramuru Viaduct (Viaduto Caramuru)
- Anchieta Palace (Palácio Anchieta)
- Solar Monjardim Museum (Museu Solar Monjardim)
- Domingos Martins Palace (Palácio Domingos Martins)
- The Monastery of São Francisco (Monastério de São Francisco)
- Church of Our Lady of the Rosary (Igreja de Nossa Senhora do Rosário)
- Santo Antônio Sanctuary (Santuário de Santo Antônio)
- Fonte Grande State Park

== Notable people ==
- Alison Cerutti — beach volleyball player (multiple Olympic medalist)
- Sandro Varejão - basketball player (former brazilian national team player)
- Anderson Varejão - basketball player (former NBA player)

== Other cities in the greater Vitória Metropolitan Region ==
- Vila Velha
- Fundão
- Guarapari
- Serra
- Cariacica
- Viana
