= Church of Our Lady of the Rosary (Vitória) =

Roman Catholic church in Espírito Santo, Brazil

- Igreja de Nossa Senhora do Rosário
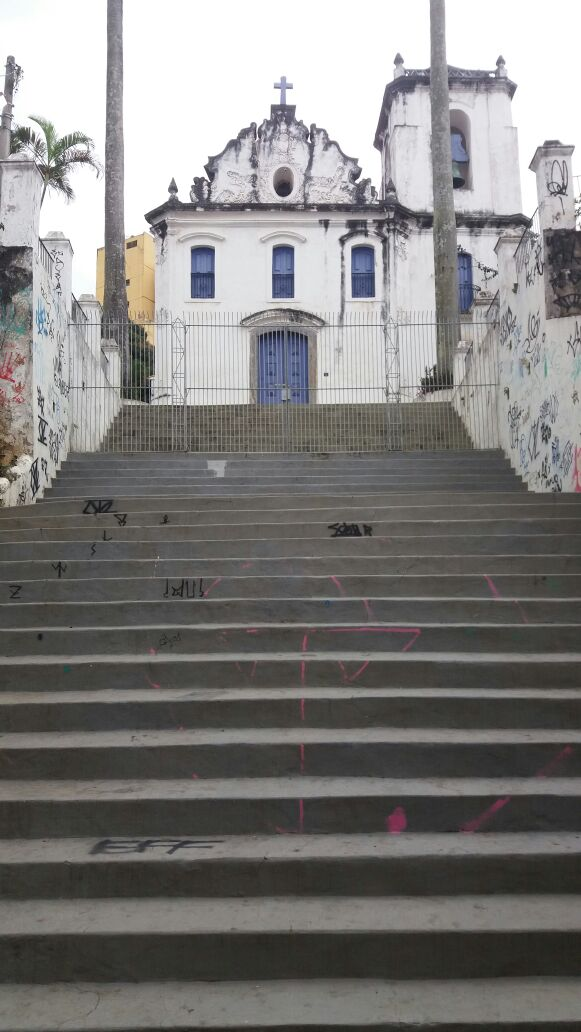
- The church in 2019

- Location of the Church of Our Lady of the Rosary

Religion
- Affiliation: Catholic
- Rite: Roman Rite
- Year consecrated: 1767
- Status: Active

Location
- Municipality: Vitória
- State: Espírito Santo
- Country: Brazil
- Interactive map of Church of Our Lady of the Rosary
- Coordinates: 20.319050°S 40.334024°W

Architecture
- Style: Baroque
- Groundbreaking: 1765
- Direction of façade: South

National Historic Heritage of Brazil
- Designated: 1950
- Reference no.: 422

The Church of Our Lady of the Rosary (Portuguese: Igreja de Nossa Senhora do Rosário) is an 18th-century Roman Catholic church located in Vitória, Espírito Santo, Brazil. It is one of numerous churches across Brazil constructed by the Afro-Brazilian brotherhood associated with Our Lady of the Rosary (Nossa Senhora do Rosário). The Church of Our Lady of the Rosary in Vila Velha was listed as a historic structure by National Institute of Historic and Artistic Heritage (IPHAN) in 1950.

== History ==
Construction of Our Lady of the Rosary began in 1765 and was completed in two years using slave labor. The Bishopric of Bahia granted the Brotherhood of Our Lady of the Rosary permission to build a church, and the land was donated by captain Felipe Gonçalves dos Santos on Pernambuco, a small hill. The Casa de Leilão, an auction house, was constructed next to the church to fund the manumission of slaves; while abandoned, it remains on the property. The church has been enlarged at least three times and was restored between 1969 and 1970. Much of the early colonial-style architecture of Vitória was demolished during urban renewal in the 19th and 20th century; Our Lady of the Rosary is a remaining example of Baroque architecture in the city.

The Church of Our Lady of the Rosary no longer conducts religious services; it is primarily open for visitation and for the celebration of the Festival of St. Benedict in December. The situation has created an impasse between the board of directors of the church, the local community, and the Roman Catholic Archdiocese of Vitória.

=== Renovations ===
The Church of Our Lady of the Rosary was first renovated by IPHAN (then SPHAN ) in 1950. The tile roof was replaced by a reinforced concrete roof in 1980; the walls, paintings, and wooden choir structures were repaired in 2015.

== Structure ==
The Church of Our Lady of the Rosary is built in the Baroque style common to the period. The façade of the church and cemetery wall date to the 17th century; the bell tower, chancel, and sacristy date to the 19th century. The exterior of the bell tower resembles those of the Church of the Magi (Igreja dos Reis Magos) and the Church of Our Lady of Help (Igreja Nossa Senhora da Ajuda), both Jesuit churches. The portal and three windows of the church have curved lintels.

The church and its broad steps once opened to the waterfront of Vitória, but the church is now surrounded by a dense urban area. The stair leading to the churchyard is both steep and irregular; the steps are made of individual stones of both irregular shape and size. The church is framed by two large palm trees at the top of the stairway.

A cemetery was built to the side of the church to ensure a burial place for members of the Brotherhood. Public cemeteries in the colonial period did not allow the burial of Afro-Brazilians, even those emancipated before death. The church has a small museum to house sacred pieces and vestments. It also houses a platform used during its annual procession; it weighs approximately 400 kilograms (880 lb).

The interior consists of a nave, chancel, and sacristy. Its corridors have two ossuaries for members of the Brotherhood of Our Lady of the Rosary. The church has four altars; the high altar dates to 1911. It houses an image of Our Lady of the Rosary. It also houses images of two Ethiopian saints traditionally revered by Afro-Brazilians: Saint Elesbaan (Santo Elesbão) and Saint Ephigenia (Santa Efigênia).

== Protected status ==
The Church of Our Lady of the Rosary was listed as a historic structure by the National Institute of Historic and Artistic Heritage in 1950. It is listed in the Book of Historical Works process no. 422.
