= Vitória (island) =

Island in Brazil

Native name: Ilha de Vitória
- Location within Brazil

Geography
- Coordinates: 20.294260°S 40.324490°W
- Area: 89 km^{2} (34 sq mi)

Administration
- Brazil
- State: Espírito Santo
- Largest settlement: Vitória

Demographics
- Population: 358,875 (2015)
- Pop. density: 3,370.79/km^{2} (8730.31/sq mi)

Vitória Island is an archipelago and island in Espírito Santo state, Brazil. Vitória, the capital of Espírito Santo, is situated on the main island. The main island has an area of 89 km² and a population of 358,875, according to 2015 estimates.

The central massif of the island contains the Fonte Grande State Park as well as the Gruta da Onça Park, Pedra dos Olhos Ecological Reserve and the Tabuazeiro Park.
