= Third Bridge =

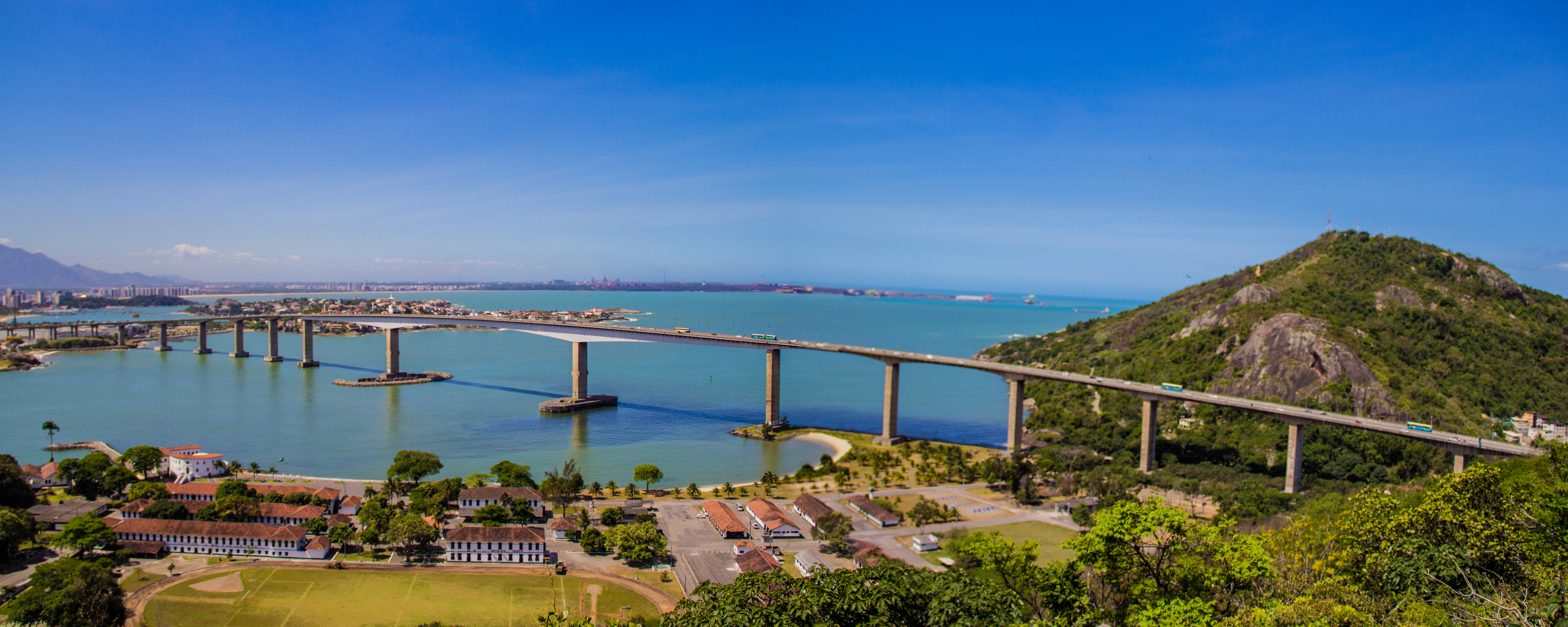
- Panoramic view of the Third Bridge
- Coordinates: 20°19′S 40°17′W
- Carries: 15 lanes
- Crosses: Vitória Bay
- Maintained by: RodoSol

Characteristics
- Design: Steel and pre-stressed concrete bridge
- Total length: 3.3 kilometres (2.1 mi)
- Height: 70 metres (230 ft)
- Longest span: 260 metres (850 ft)

History
- Construction start: 1978
- Construction end: August 23, 1989

Statistics
- Daily traffic: 58 thousand

Location
- Interactive map of Third Bridge

The Deputy Darcy Castelo de Mendonça Bridge, colloquially known as the Third Bridge (Portuguese: Terceira Ponte), is the second tallest bridge in Brazil, connecting the cities of Vila Velha and Vitória in the state of Espírito Santo. Spanning the mouth of Vitória Bay, which has many other features, including the Penha Convent, Moreno's hill, freight ships, coastline, islands and modern buildings, the bridge has become one of Espírito Santo's main landmarks.

== History ==
=== Construction and impact ===
Construction began on the bridge in 1978 and was completed and 11 years later on August 23, 1989. The Third Bridge was so dubbed in reference to two older bridges between Vitória and Vila Velha: Florentino Avidos Bridge, known as 'Five Bridges' ('Cinco Pontes'); and the Prince Bridge (Ponte do Príncipe), known as the 'Second Bridge'. It is now the main link between Vitória and the southern coast of Espírito Santo.

After the Third Bridge was completed, Vila Velha, previously known as a sleepy seaside town, entered a period of intense civil development.

== Traffic and maintenance ==
12,000 vehicles a day crossed the bridge soon after its completion. Since then, the traffic has increased to 58,000 per day. The bridge has a modern structure, which includes lighting, signalling, mechanical assistance and emergency medical services. The operation of the Third Bridge is monitored by its Operational Control Center. On December 21, 2003, aiming to enhance the image of the bridge and beautify the city, RodoSol, the company maintaining the bridge, installed blue fluorescent lamps on the central pillars of the third bridge.

The bridge does not carry rail lines nor have any pedestrian access, however a cycleway was installed on the bridge in 2023.

== Gallery ==
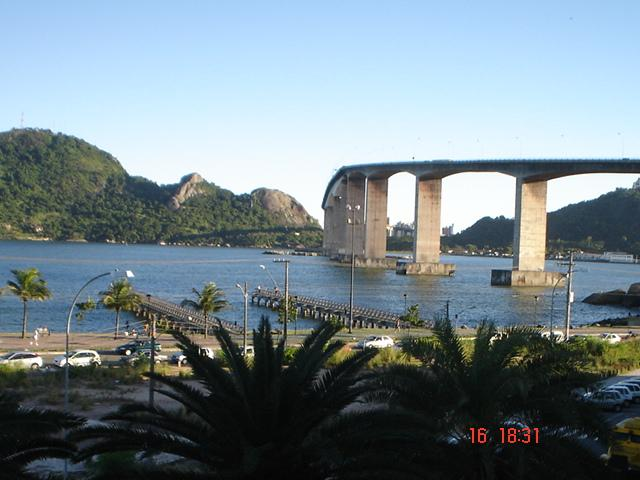
The Third Bridge, Moreno's hill on the far left.

== See also ==
- List of bridges by length
