= Portuguese colonization of the Americas =

Portuguese colonization of the Americas (Portuguese: Colonização portuguesa das Américas) constituted territories in the Americas belonging to the Kingdom of Portugal. Portugal was the leading country in the European exploration of the world in the 15th century. The Treaty of Tordesillas in 1494 divided the Earth outside Europe into Castilian and Portuguese global territorial hemispheres for exclusive conquest and colonization. Portugal colonized parts of South America (Brazil, Uruguay), but also made some unsuccessful attempts to colonize North America (Newfoundland and Labrador and Nova Scotia in Canada).

== Settlements in North America ==
Portuguese North America (in present-day Canada); Vaz Dourado, c. 1576.

Based on the terms defined in the Treaty of Tordesillas, the Portuguese Crown claimed it had territorial rights in the area visited by the explorer John Cabot in 1497 and 1498 on behalf of the Crown of England. To that end, in 1499 and 1500, the Portuguese mariner João Fernandes Lavrador visited the northeast Atlantic coast and Greenland, which accounts for the appearance of "Labrador" on topographical maps of the period. Subsequently, in 1501 and 1502, the Corte-Real brothers explored and charted Greenland and what is today the Canadian province of Newfoundland and Labrador, claiming these lands as part of the Portuguese Empire. Fragmentary evidence also suggests a previous expedition in 1473 by João Vaz Corte-Real, their father, with other Europeans, to Terra Nova do Bacalhau (New Land of the Codfish) in North America. The possible voyage of 1473 and several other possible pre-Columbian expeditions to North America in the 15th century, mostly from the Azores in the case of the Portuguese (included in donation royal letters), remain matters of great controversy for scholars. Their existence is based on brief or fragmentary historical documents that are unclear concerning the destinations of voyages.

In 1506, King Manuel I of Portugal created taxes for the cod fisheries in Newfoundland waters. João Álvares Fagundes and Pero de Barcelos established fishing outposts in Newfoundland and Nova Scotia around 1521. These were later abandoned, however, when Portuguese colonizers began to focus their efforts mainly on South America. Nonetheless, the Portuguese-founded towns of Portugal Cove-St. Philip's, St. Peter's, St. John's, Conception Bay and surrounding areas of east Canada remain important as a cultural region, even today.

== Colonization of Brazil ==
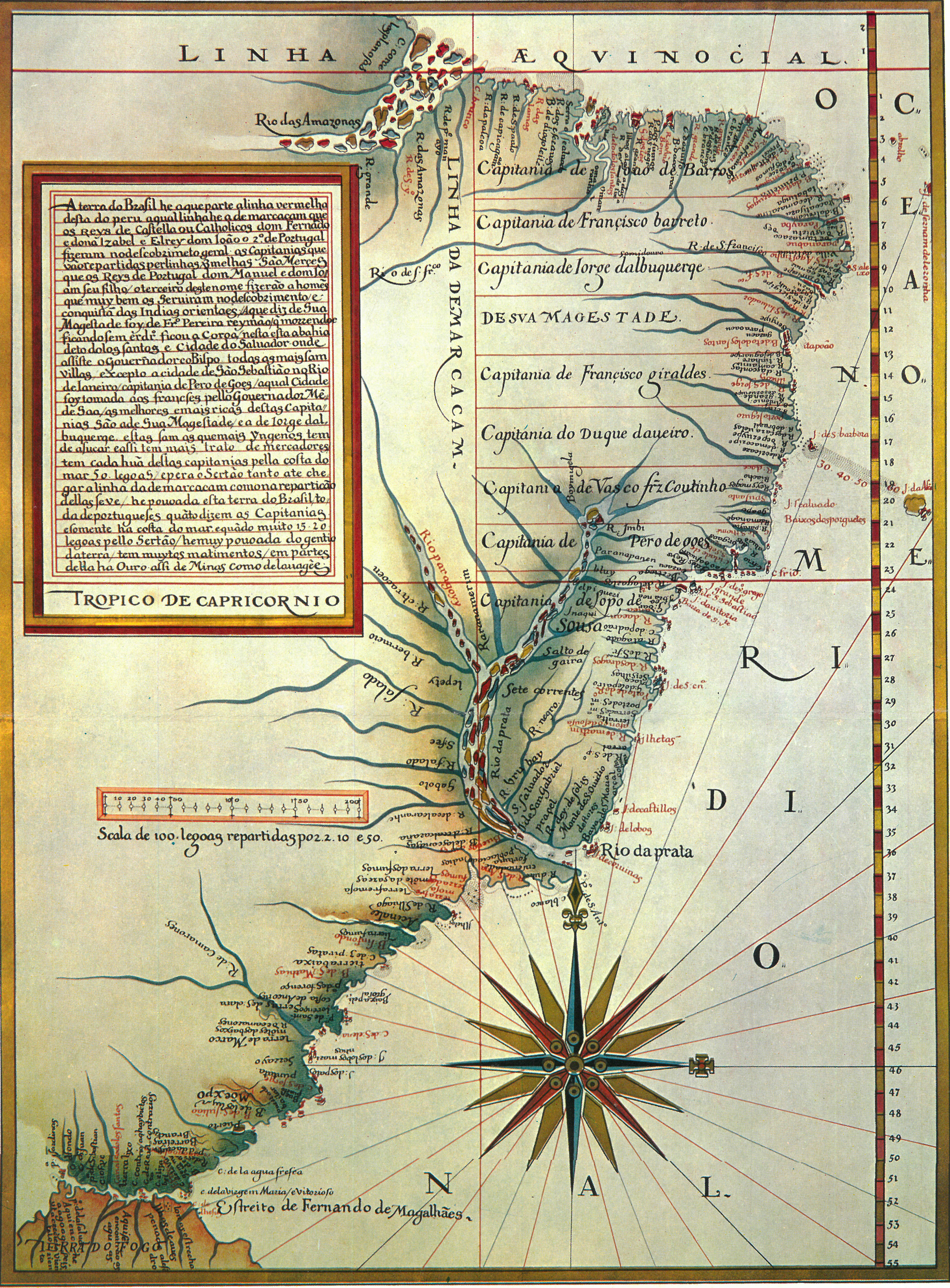
In 1549, the Captaincy Colonies of Brazil were united into the Governorate General of Brazil, where they were provincial captaincies of Brazil; Luís Teixeira, 1574.

In April 1500, the second Portuguese India Armada, headed by Pedro Álvares Cabral, with a crew of expert captains, including Bartolomeu Dias and Nicolau Coelho, encountered the Brazilian coast as it swung westward in the Atlantic while performing a large "volta do mar" to avoid becalming in the Gulf of Guinea. On 21 April 1500, a mountain was seen that was named Monte Pascoal, and on 22 April, Cabral landed on the coast, in Porto Seguro. Believing the land to be an island, he named it Ilha de Vera Cruz (Island of the True Cross). The previous expedition of Vasco da Gama to India already recorded several signs of land near its western open Atlantic Ocean route, in 1497. It has also been suggested that Duarte Pacheco Pereira may have discovered the coasts of Brazil in 1498, possible its northeast, but the exact area of the expedition and the explored regions remain unclear. On the other hand, some historians have suggested that the Portuguese may have encountered the South American bulge earlier while sailing the "volta do mar" (in the Southwest Atlantic), hence the insistence of King John II in moving the line west of the line agreed upon in the Treaty of Tordesillas in 1494. From the east coast, the fleet then turned eastward to resume the journey to the southern tip of Africa and India. Landing in the New World and reaching Asia, the expedition connected four continents for the first time in history.

In 1501–1502, an expedition led by Gonçalo Coelho (or André Gonçalves and/or Gaspar de Lemos), sailed south along the coast of South America to the bay of present-day Rio de Janeiro. Among his crew was the Florentine Amerigo Vespucci. According to Vespucci, the expedition reached the latitude "South Pole elevation 52° S" in the "cold" latitudes of what is now Patagonia, near the Strait of Magellan, before turning back. Vespucci wrote that they headed toward the southwest-south, following "a long, unbending coastline". This seems controversial, since he changed part of his description in the subsequent letter (stating that around 32° S, they made a shift to open sea, to south-southeast), maintaining, however, that they reached a similar 50° S latitude.

Amerigo Vespucci participated as observer in four Spanish and Portuguese exploratory voyages. The expeditions became widely known in Europe after two accounts attributed to him, published between 1502 and 1504. His last two voyages to the east and southern east coasts of South America, by Portugal, especially the expedition of 1501–1502 to Brazil and beyond, and its meeting with Cabral's ships and men (who had touched the South American, African and Asian continents) on the African coast, at Bezeguiche (the bay of Dakar, Senegal), listening the accounts of its sailors (then returning to Portugal), were the most decisive for his "New World" hypothesis. Vespucci suggested that the newly discovered lands (especially what is today South America/Brazil) were not the Indies but a "New World", the Mundus novus, Latin title of a contemporary document based on Vespucci letters to Lorenzo di Pierfrancesco de' Medici, which had become widely popular in Europe.

Around 1508 or 1511–1512, Portuguese captains reached and explored the River Plate estuary in the present-day Uruguay and Argentina, and went as far south as the present-day Gulf of San Matias at 42°S (recorded in the Newen Zeytung auss Pressilandt meaning "New Tidings from the Land of Brazil"). Some historians have attributed this voyage to Coelho and Vespucci years before, but a good part of historians and researchers, through the sparse and comparative documentation, identify the captains and the experienced pilot of the India run ("the best Pilot of Portugal" and a "best friend" of the Fugger's Agent), with Diogo Ribeiro, Estevão Frois and the pilot João de Lisboa. The explorers also reported that after going by the 40th parallel to south, along the coast, they found a "land" or "point extending into the sea", and further south, a Gulf.

This and the following expeditions of Cristóvão Jacques to the River Plate and into the Parana River in 1521; and of Martim Afonso de Sousa and his brother Pero Lopes de Sousa, in 1530–1532, from the Amazon River, to Lagoa dos Patos and to the rivers Plate and Paraná, reinforced and demonstrated Portuguese interest in the River Plate.

Permanent habitation in Brazil did not begin until São Vicente was founded in 1532 by Martim Afonso de Sousa, although temporary trading posts were established earlier to collect brazilwood, used as a dye. São Vicente, by its democratic municipal prerogatives (in the tradition of Portuguese municipalism since the Middle Ages) and by the general elections to its first Câmara (City Council) on August 22, 1532, is symbolically considered the birthplace of democracy in the Americas.

From 1534 to 1536, 15 Captaincy colonies were created in Portuguese America. The captaincies were autonomous, and mostly private, colonies of the Portuguese Empire, each owned and run by a Captain-major.

In 1549, due to their failure and limited success, the Captaincy Colonies of Brazil were united into the Governorate General of Brazil. The captaincy colonies were reorganized as provincial districts to the Governorate. The captaincies continued to be ruled by their hereditary captain-majors but they now reported to the Governor-General of Brazil. The new system was implemented so that Portuguese America could be managed correctly and provide a steady and wealthy income for the Portuguese Empire. The capital of the new governorate established its capital at São Salvador and the first Jesuits arrived the same year.

With permanent settlement came the establishment of the sugar cane industry and its intensive labor demands which were met with Native and later African slaves.

From 1565 through 1567, Mem de Sá, the third Governor General of Brazil, successfully destroyed a ten-year-old French colony called France Antarctique, at Guanabara Bay. He and his nephew, Estácio de Sá, then founded the city of Rio de Janeiro in March 1567.

In 1621, Philip II of Portugal divided the Governorate General of Brazil into two separate and autonomous colonies, the State of Maranhão and the State of Brazil. Regarding this period it is preferable to refer to "Portuguese America" rather than "Portuguese Brazil" or "Colonial Brazil", as the states were two separate colonies, each with their own governor general and government.

Spanish and Portuguese empires in 1790.

Between 1630 and 1654, the Netherlands came to control part of Brazil's Northeast region, with their capital in Recife. The Portuguese won a significant victory in the Second Battle of Guararapes in 1649. By 1654, the Netherlands had surrendered and returned control of all Brazilian land to the Portuguese.

In 1751, the State of Maranhão was restructured into the State of Grão-Pará and Maranhão, with a new capital and government.

In 1772, the State of Grão-Pará and Maranhão was split into two new states, the State of Grão-Pará and Rio Negro and the State of Maranhão and Piauí. The new states would fare poorly and only last 3 years.

In 1775, the three colonies of Portuguese America (the State of Brazil, the State of Maranhão and Piauí; and the State of Grão-Pará and Rio Negro) were united into a singular colony, under the State of Brazil. This arrangement would last until the end of Colonial Brazil. As a result, Brazil did not split into several countries, as happened to its Spanish-speaking neighbors.

== Caribbean merchants ==
Portuguese merchants have been trading in the West Indies. To such an extent, that, for instance, for the Portuguese town of Póvoa de Varzim, most of its seafarers dying abroad, most of the deaths occurred in the Route of the Antilles, in the West Indies. At the turn of the 17th century, with the union with Castile, the Spanish kings favored the free movement of the people, and other lands of the New World, such as Peru and the Gulf of Mexico, were open to the Portuguese merchants.

== Colonization of Uruguay ==
The Portuguese founded the first Uruguayan city, Colónia do Sacramento.

== See also ==
- Atlantic World
- Barbados
- Catholic Church and the Age of Discovery
- Portuguese Guyanese
- Colonial Brazil
- Portuguese in Mexico
- Arquivo Histórico Ultramarino (archives in Lisbon documenting Portuguese Empire, including the Americas)
- Former colonies and territories in Canada
- History of Brazil
- Jesuit Reductions
- Portugal in the period of discoveries
- João Vaz Corte-Real
- History of Portugal (1415–1578)
