= Federative units of Brazil =

Subnational administrative units of Brazil

Federative units of Brazil Unidades federativas do Brasil (Portuguese)
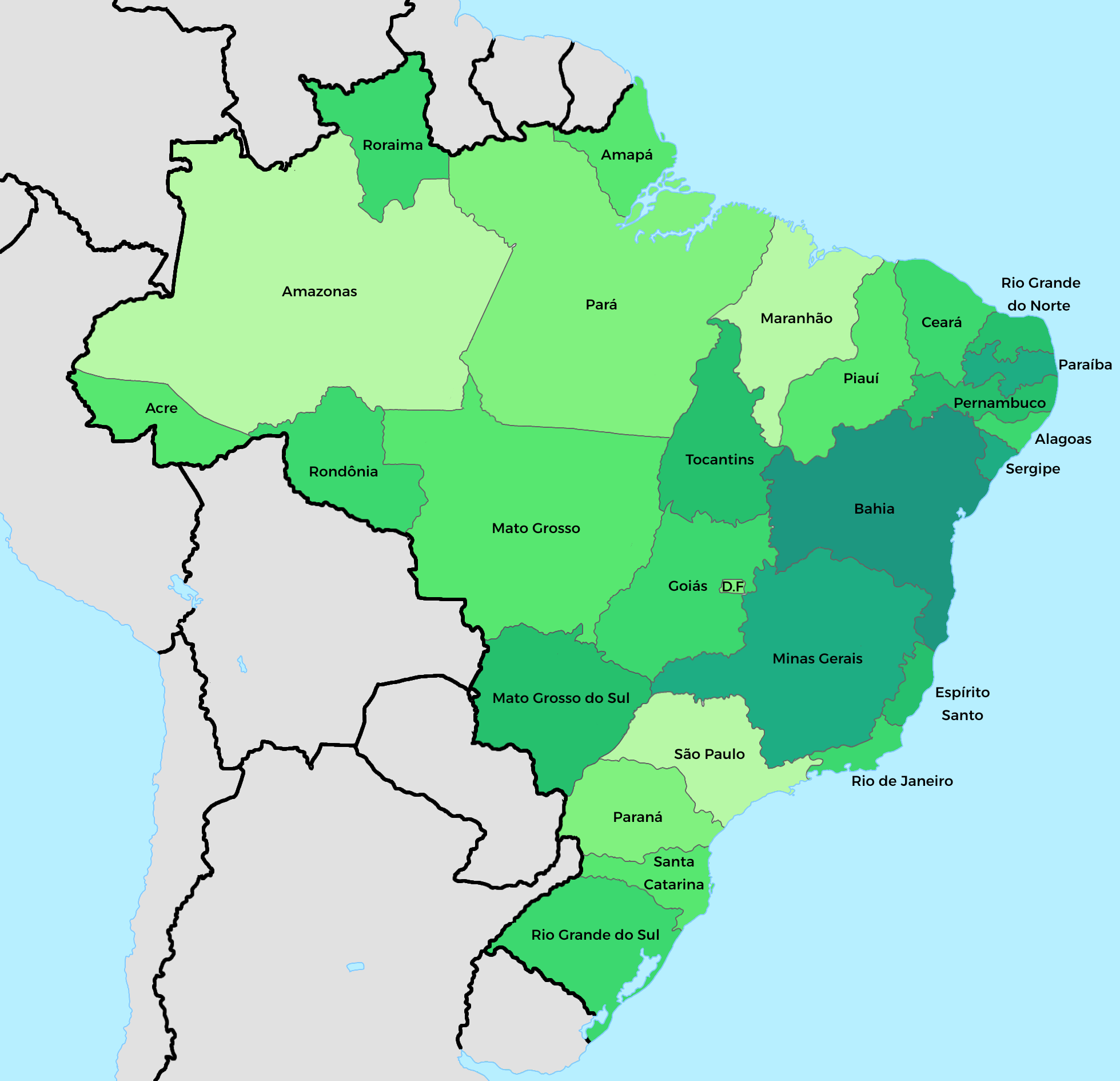
- Map of modern federated units of Brazil
- Category: Federated state
- Location: Federative Republic of Brazil
- Number: 26 states and 1 federal district
- Populations: 636,707 (Roraima) – 44,411,238 (São Paulo)
- Areas: 5,761 km^{2} (2,224 sq mi) (Federal District) – 1,559,168 km^{2} (601,998 sq mi) (Amazonas)
- Government: State government
- Subdivisions: Municipalities

Brazil is divided into federative units which have a certain degree of autonomy (self-government, self-regulation, and self-collection) and are endowed with their own government and constitution. There are 26 states (estados) and one federal district (distrito federal). The states are generally based on historical, conventional borders which have developed over time. The states are divided into municipalities, while the Federal District assumes the competences of both a state and a municipality.

== Government ==
The government of each state of Brazil is divided into executive, legislative and judiciary branches.

The state executive branch is headed by a state governor and includes a vice governor, both elected by the citizens of the state. The governor appoints several secretaries of state (each one in charge of a given portfolio) and the state attorney-general.

The state legislative branch is the legislative assembly, a unicameral body composed of deputies elected by the citizens of the state.

The judiciary in each of the states is composed of judges of law, who constitute the courts of first instance, and a Court of Justice, which is the court of second instance of the state and is composed of judges called desembargadores. Judges qualify through exams or are appointed.

The states are divided into municipalities, which have different competences and are considered autonomous from the states. Municipalities have a mayor, vice mayor and a chamber of aldermen, all elected by the citizens of the municipality, but do not have a separate judiciary.

The Federal District has the same executive, legislative and judiciary organization as a state, but it cannot be divided into municipalities, which is why its territory is composed of several administrative regions. These regions are directly managed by the government of the Federal District, which exercises constitutional and legal powers that are equivalent to those of the states, as well as those of the municipalities, thus simultaneously assuming all the obligations arising from them.

Fernando de Noronha is not a municipality, but a state district of Pernambuco (the only state district in the country). It is governed by an administrator-general, appointed by the governor of Pernambuco, and a council whose members are elected by the citizens of the district.

All states and the Federal District are represented in the national congress, each with three senators and between eight and 70 deputies, depending on their population. The citizens of all states and the Federal District vote for these national representatives and for president and vice president.

While all of the states of Brazil share their political structure with its federal counterpart, one difference is that while Brazil is a federation, the said states are the contrasting unitary structure.

== History ==
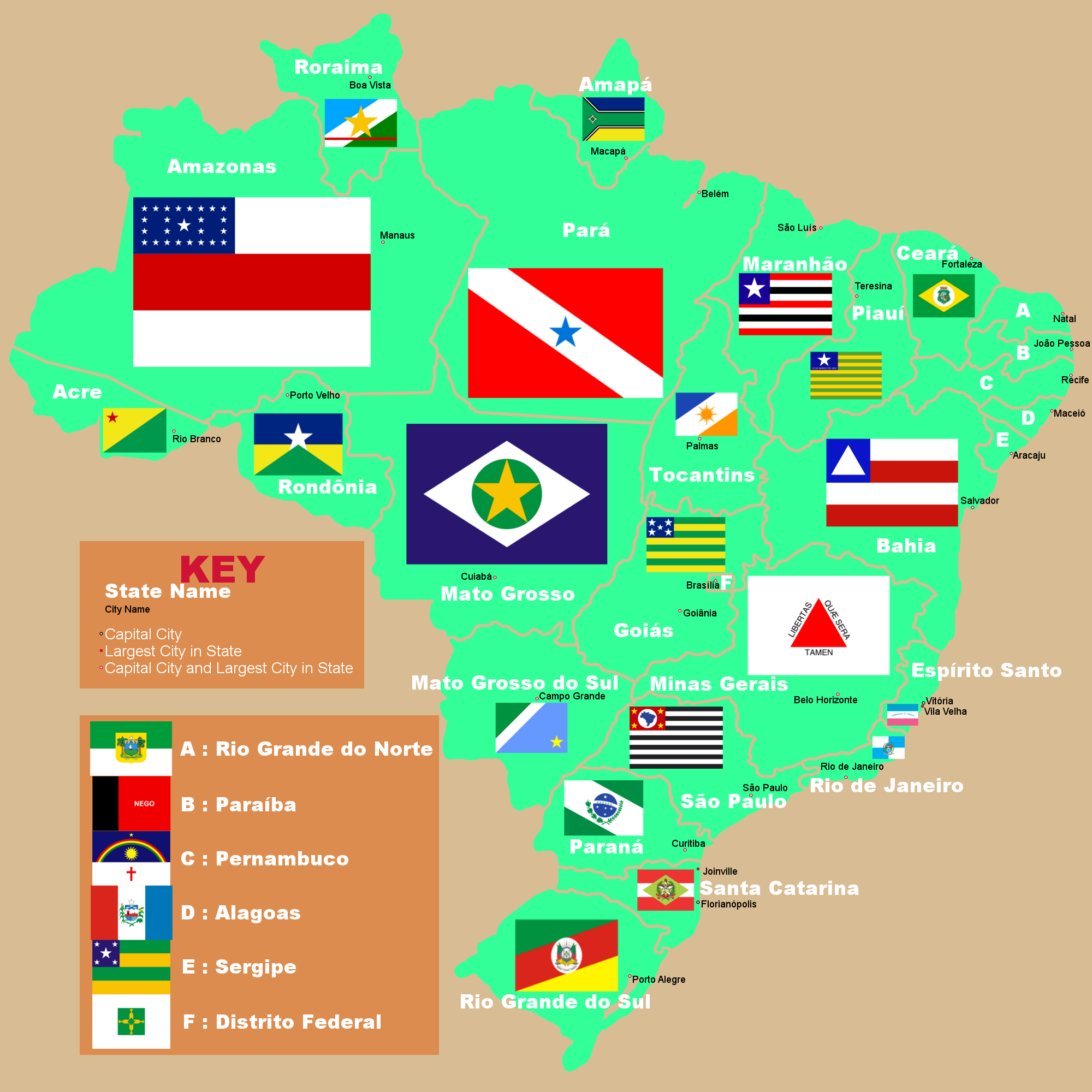
The States of Brazil, their respective flags, their state capitals, and their largest cities.

The present states of Brazil trace their history directly to the captaincies established by Portugal following the Treaty of Tordesillas which divided the World between Portugal and Spain.

The first administrative divisions of Brazil were the hereditary captaincies (capitanias hereditárias), stretches of land granted by the Portuguese Crown to noblemen or merchants with a charter to colonize the land. The first such captaincy was the island of São João, granted in 1504 to Fernão de Loronha. The continental land was divided into captaincies in 1534, generally following lines of latitude, although some followed meridians or diagonal lines. Each of the holders of these captaincies was referred to as a captain donatary (capitão donatário). The captaincies were to be inherited by the holders' descendants, but the Crown retained the power to reacquire them.

In 1549, the Portuguese Crown appointed Tomé de Sousa as the first governor-general of the vast Portuguese dominion in South America, known as the State of Brazil (Estado do Brasil). In 1621, the northern part of the dominion was detached, becoming a separate entity known as the State of Maranhão. However, captaincies continued existing under both states as regional administrations.

During the Iberian Union (1580–1640), which allowed Portuguese settlers to enter Spanish domains, the territory of Portuguese colonial domains in South America was more than doubled, with both states of Brazil and Maranhão greatly expanding westward. After the union ended, Portugal asserted its territorial claims, which Spain eventually accepted with the Treaty of Madrid in 1750. Several captaincies were created or merged during this period, in both the original and western domains, and some were returned to the Crown, becoming royal captaincies.

The government of the Marquis of Pombal (1750–1777) significantly centralized the administration of the Portuguese colonies. By 1759, all captaincies had been returned to the Crown, with captains becoming appointed rather than recognized by inheritance. Some captaincies were designated as captaincies-general, to which other captaincies were subordinated. In addition, the State of Grão-Pará and Rio Negro and the State of Maranhão and Piauí, which had been split from the State of Maranhão, were reincorporated into the State of Brazil in 1775, under a single governor-general. This centralization later helped to keep Brazil as a unified nation-state, avoiding fragmentation similar to that of the Spanish domains.

The captaincies became provinces in 1821, during the final years of the Kingdom of Brazil (united with Portugal), and maintained that designation after independence in 1822 under the Empire of Brazil. Most internal boundaries were kept unchanged from the end of the colonial period, generally following natural features such as rivers and mountain ridges. Some changes were made to suit domestic politics (transferring the Triângulo Mineiro from Goiás to Minas Gerais, transferring the south bank of the São Francisco River from Pernambuco to Minas Gerais and later to Bahia, separating the capital city of Rio de Janeiro as a Neutral Municipality outside any province, splitting Amazonas from Pará, and splitting Paraná from São Paulo), as well as international border adjustments resulting from diplomatic settlement of territorial disputes. The Cisplatine Province was annexed into Brazil in 1821, declared independence as Uruguay in 1825, and was recognized by the Treaty of Montevideo in 1828.

When Brazil became a republic in 1889, all provinces became states, and the Neutral Municipality became the Federal District. In 1903, Brazil acquired the territory of Acre from Bolivia with the Treaty of Petrópolis.

In 1942–1943, with the entrance of Brazil into World War II, the Vargas regime detached six strategic territories from the borders of the country to administer them directly: the archipelago of Fernando de Noronha (from Pernambuco), Amapá (from Pará), Rio Branco (from Amazonas), Guaporé (from Mato Grosso and Amazonas), Ponta Porã (from Mato Grosso) and Iguaçu (from Paraná and Santa Catarina). Shortly after the war, the Brazilian constitution of 1946 returned Ponta Porã and Iguaçu to their original states. Guaporé was renamed Rondônia in 1956, and Rio Branco was renamed Roraima in 1962, while remaining territories along with Amapá and Fernando de Noronha. Acre became a state in 1962.

In 1960, the rectangular-shaped Distrito Federal was carved out of Goiás to contain the new capital, Brasília. The previous federal district became the state of Guanabara, but in 1975 it was reincorporated into its original state of Rio de Janeiro, becoming its capital as the city of Rio de Janeiro.

In 1977, the southern part of Mato Grosso became the state of Mato Grosso do Sul. In 1981, Rondônia became a state. The Brazilian constitution of 1988 created the state of Tocantins from the northern portion of Goiás, established Amapá and Roraima as states, and returned the archipelago of Fernando de Noronha to Pernambuco. The constitution thus ended all remaining territories, although it maintained the possibility of creating others in the future.

=== Proposed federative states ===
==== Proposed division of Pará ====
On 11 December 2011, a consultative referendum was held in the state of Pará about creating two new states from parts of it (Tapajós and Carajás, with the rest of the state remaining as Pará). Both proposals were rejected by about 66% of statewide voters, but reflecting a strong geographic split with over 90% approval by voters in the proposed breakaway regions and over 90% disapproval by those in the rest of the state.

=== Maps ===
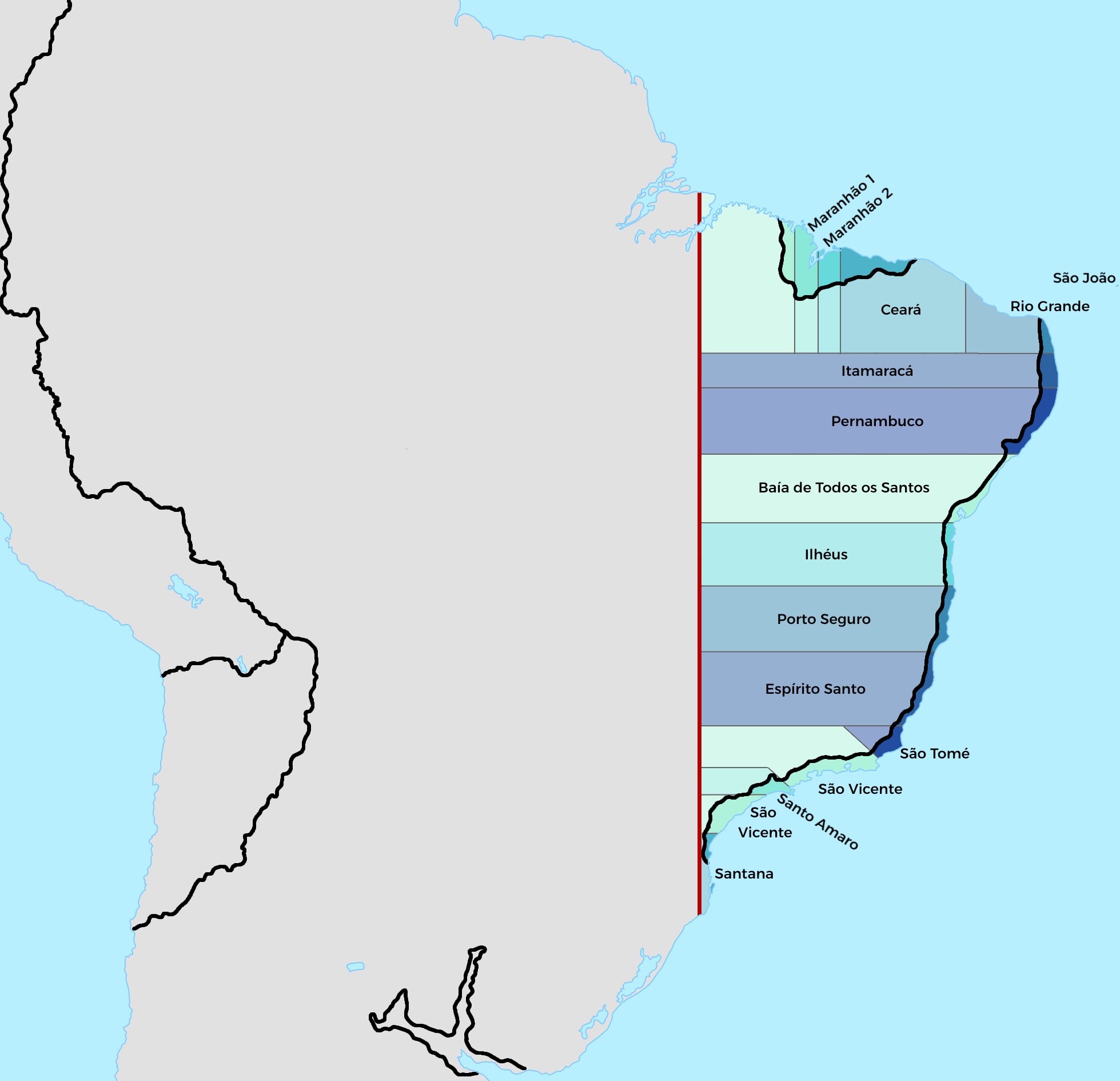
1534
Captaincies of Brazil

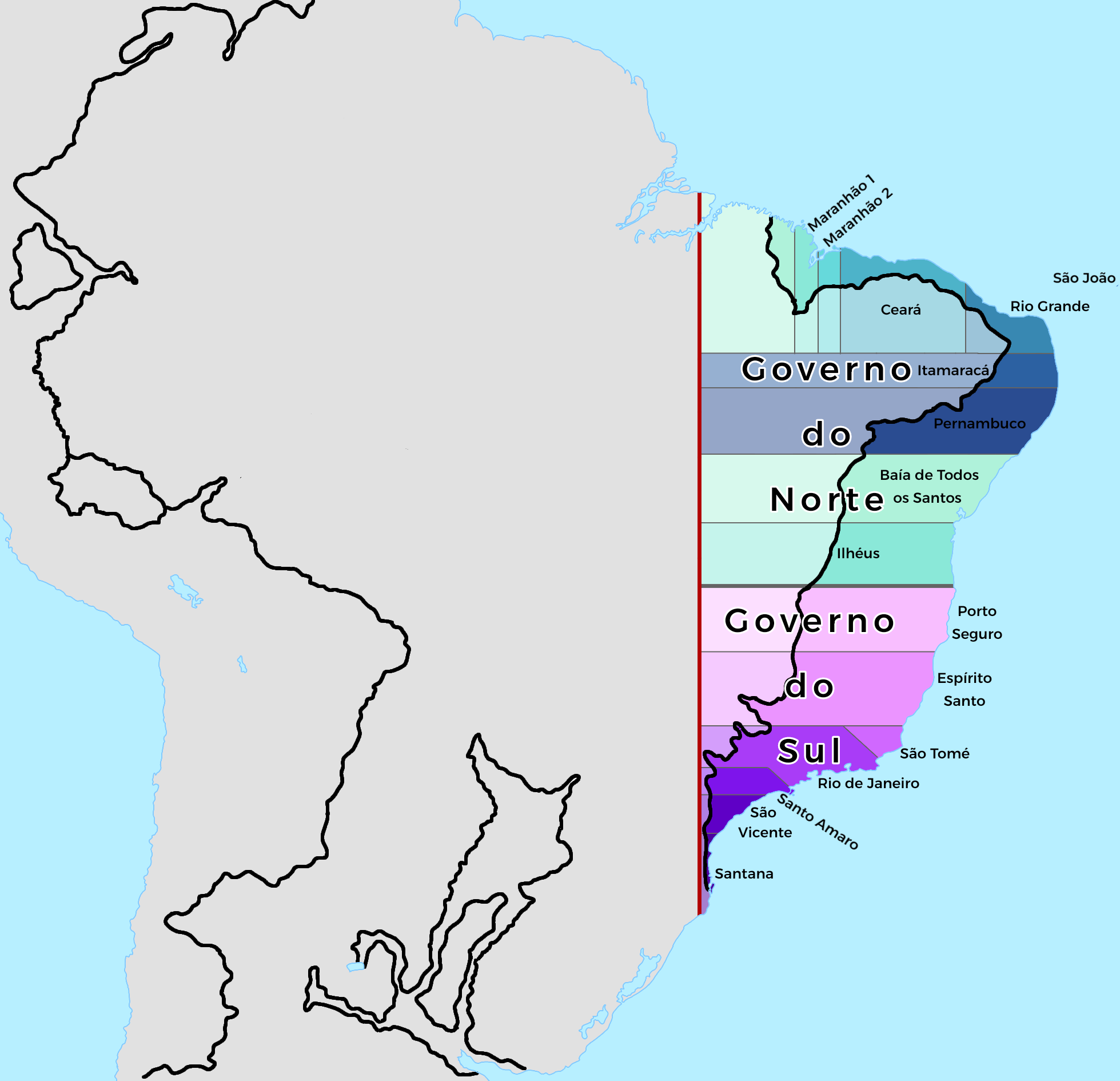
1574
The division of Brazil into two governments.

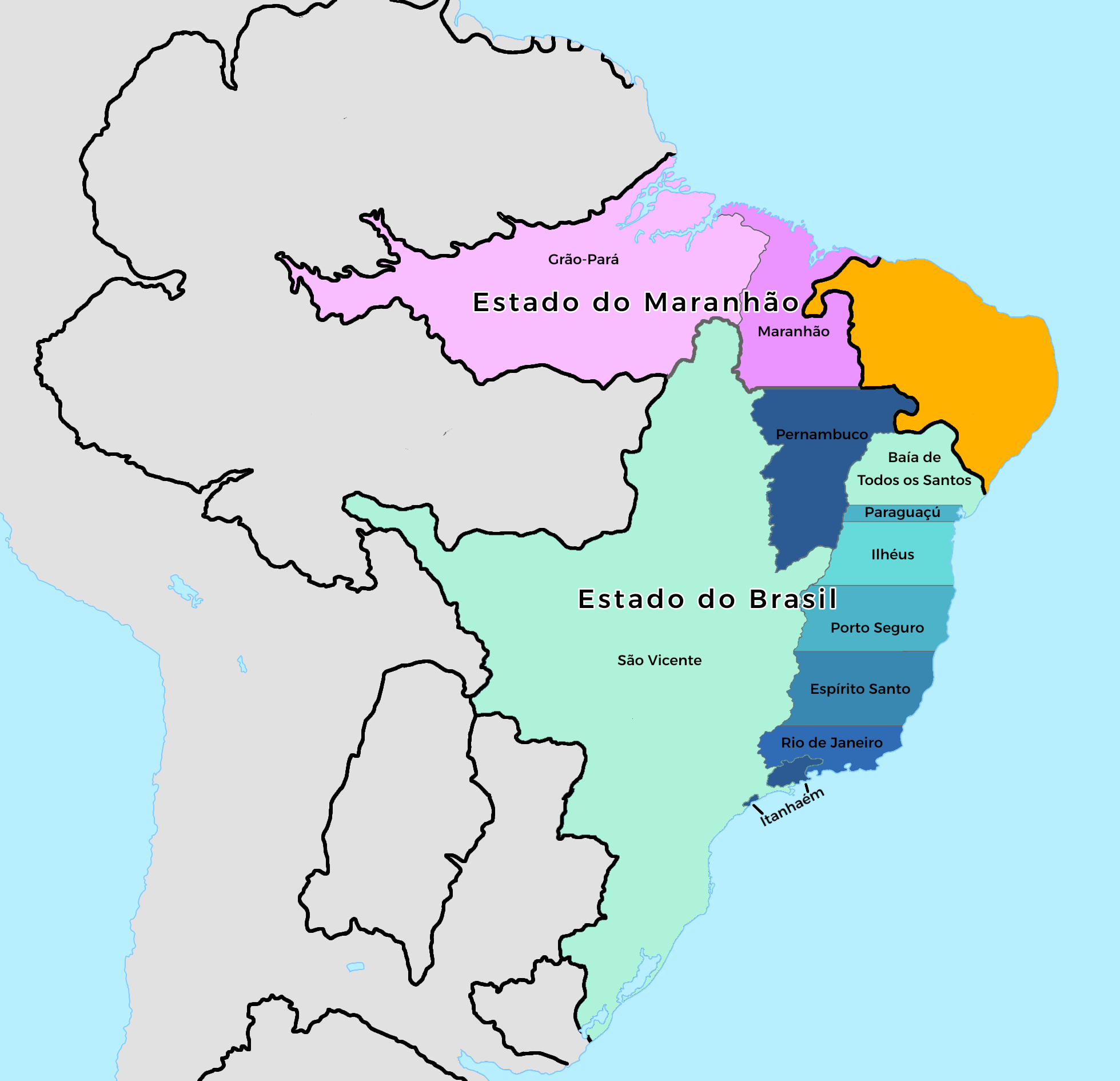
1647
Dutch invasions of Brazil

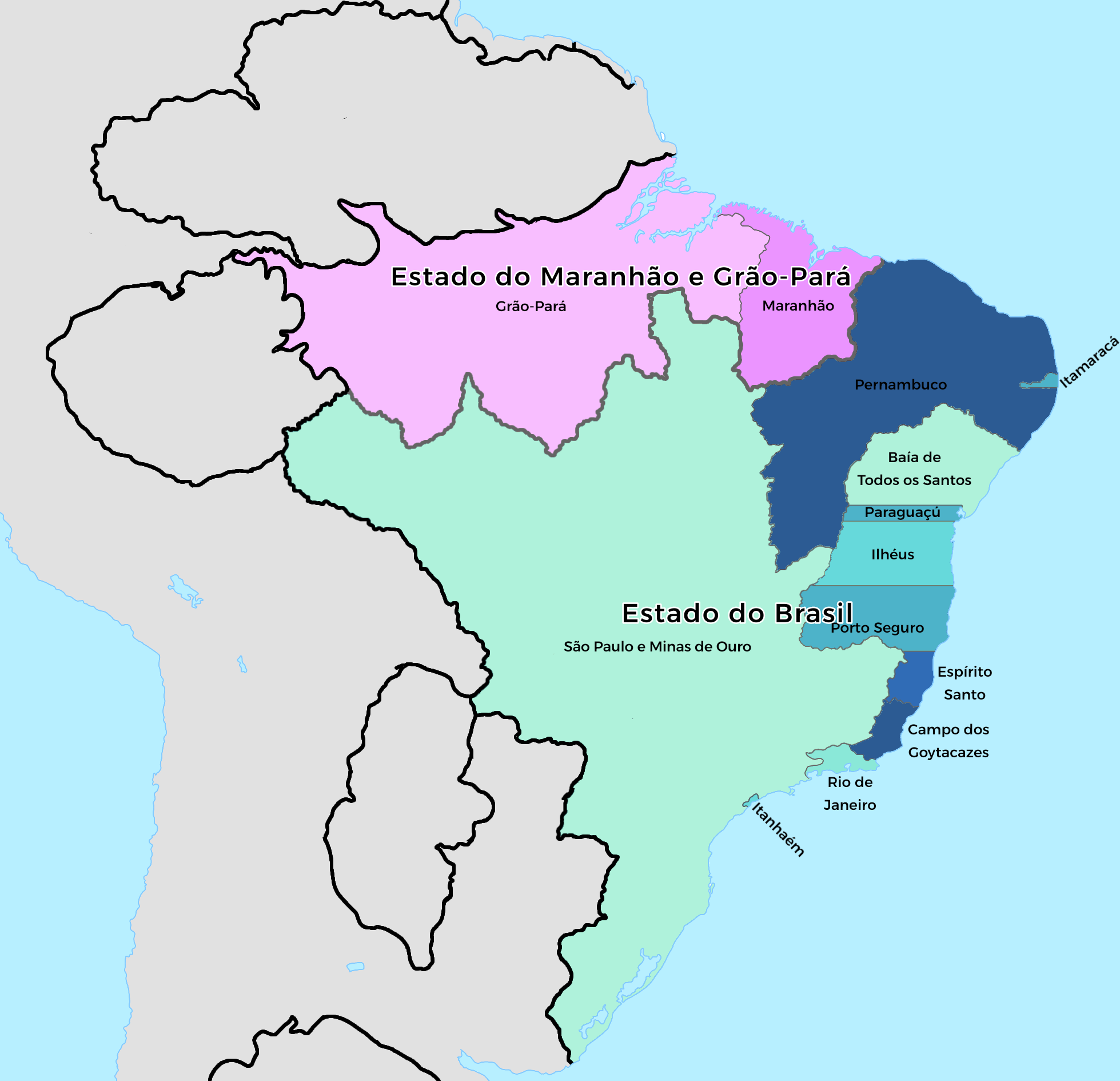
1709
Expansion and mergers

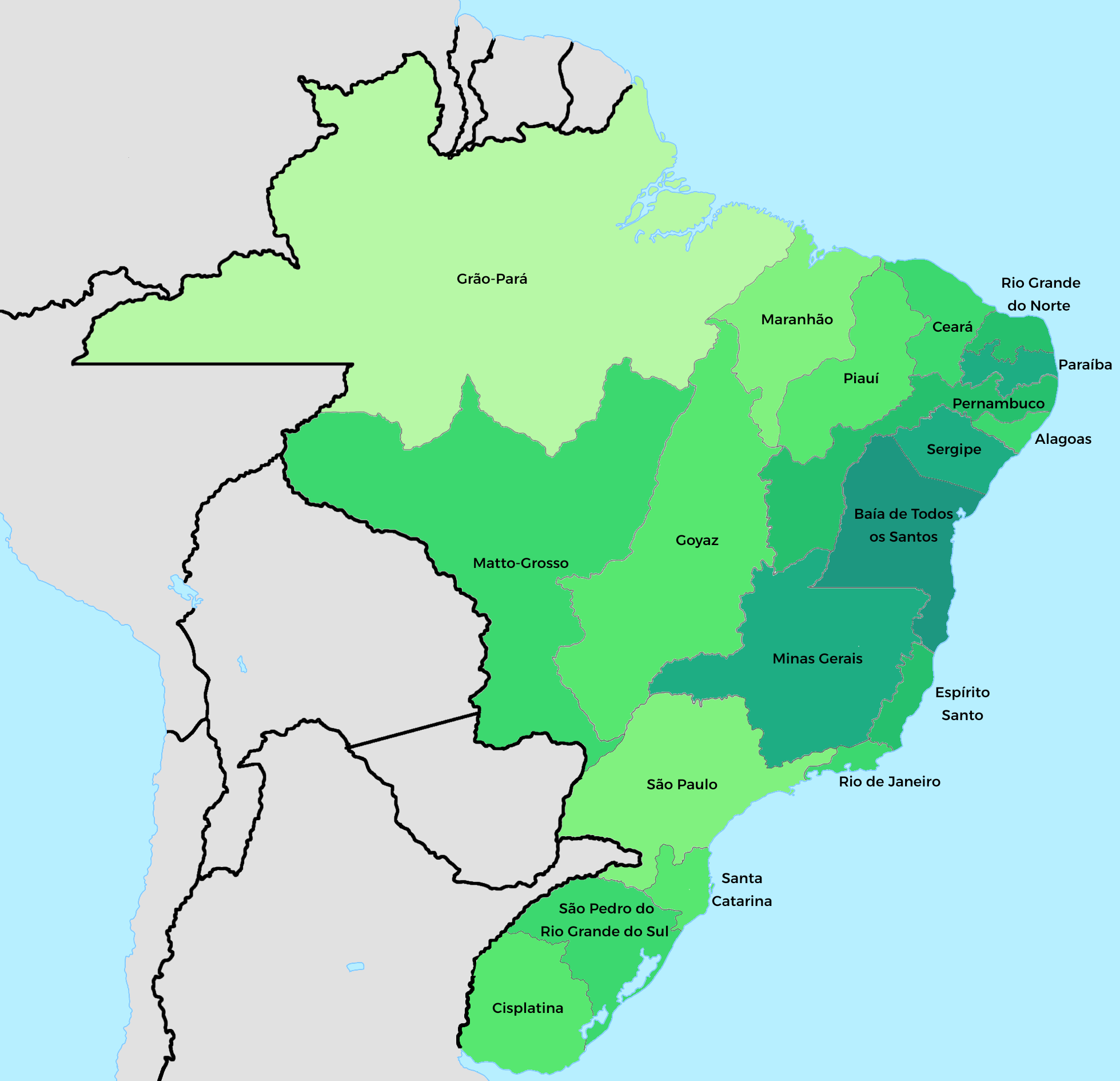
1822
Imperial provinces

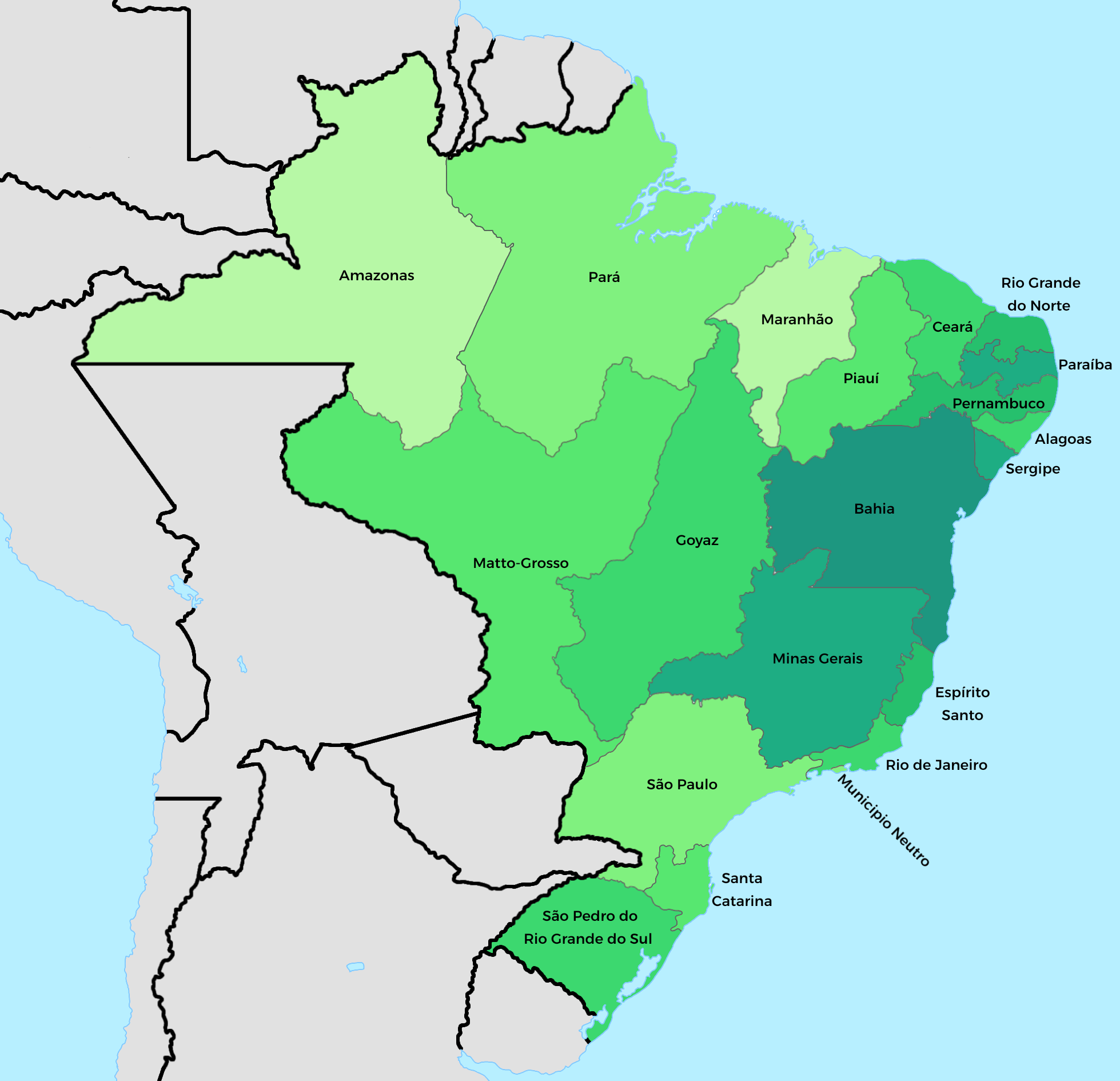
1850
Division of the Grão-Pará province

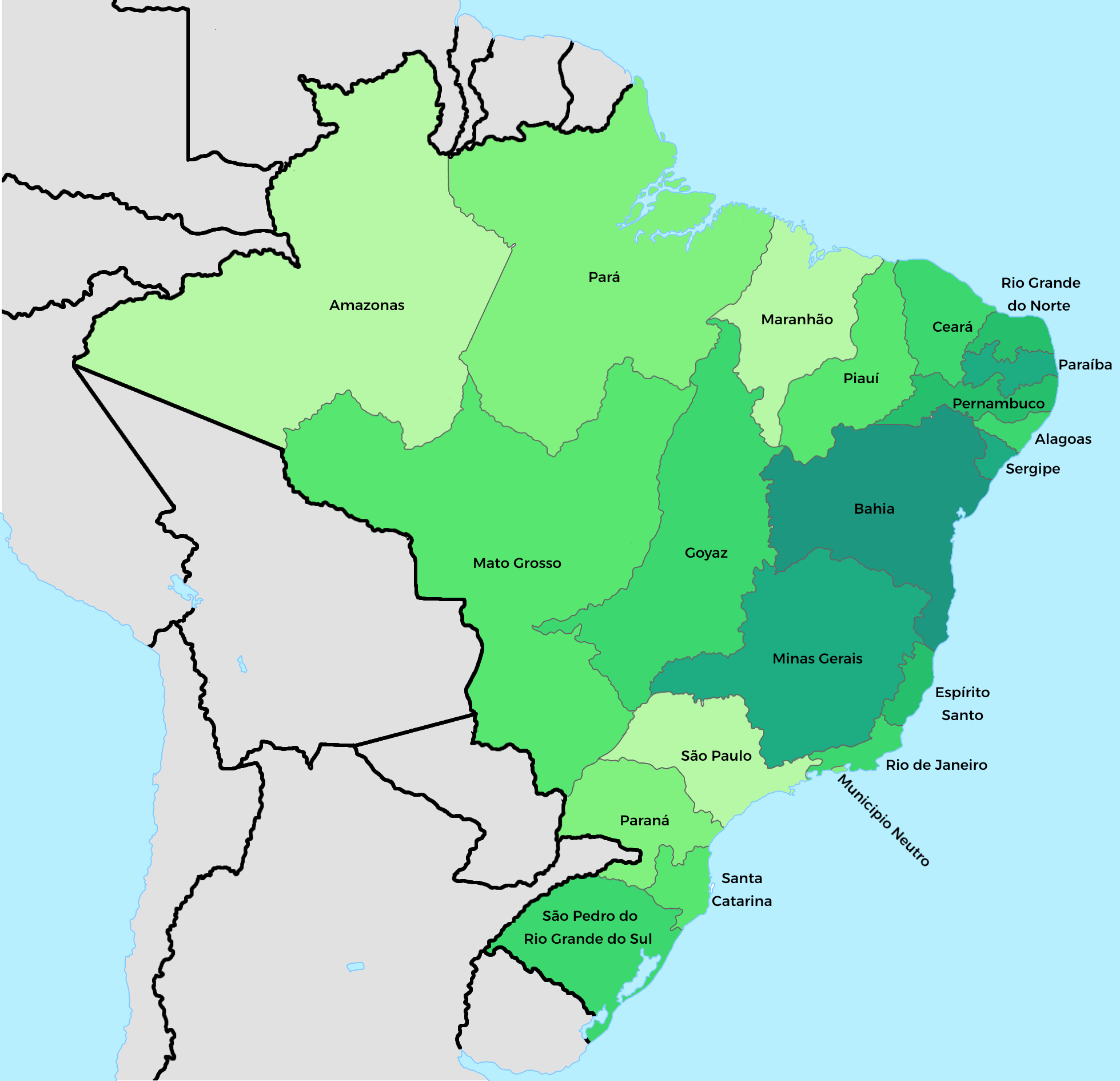
1889
States at the start of the republic

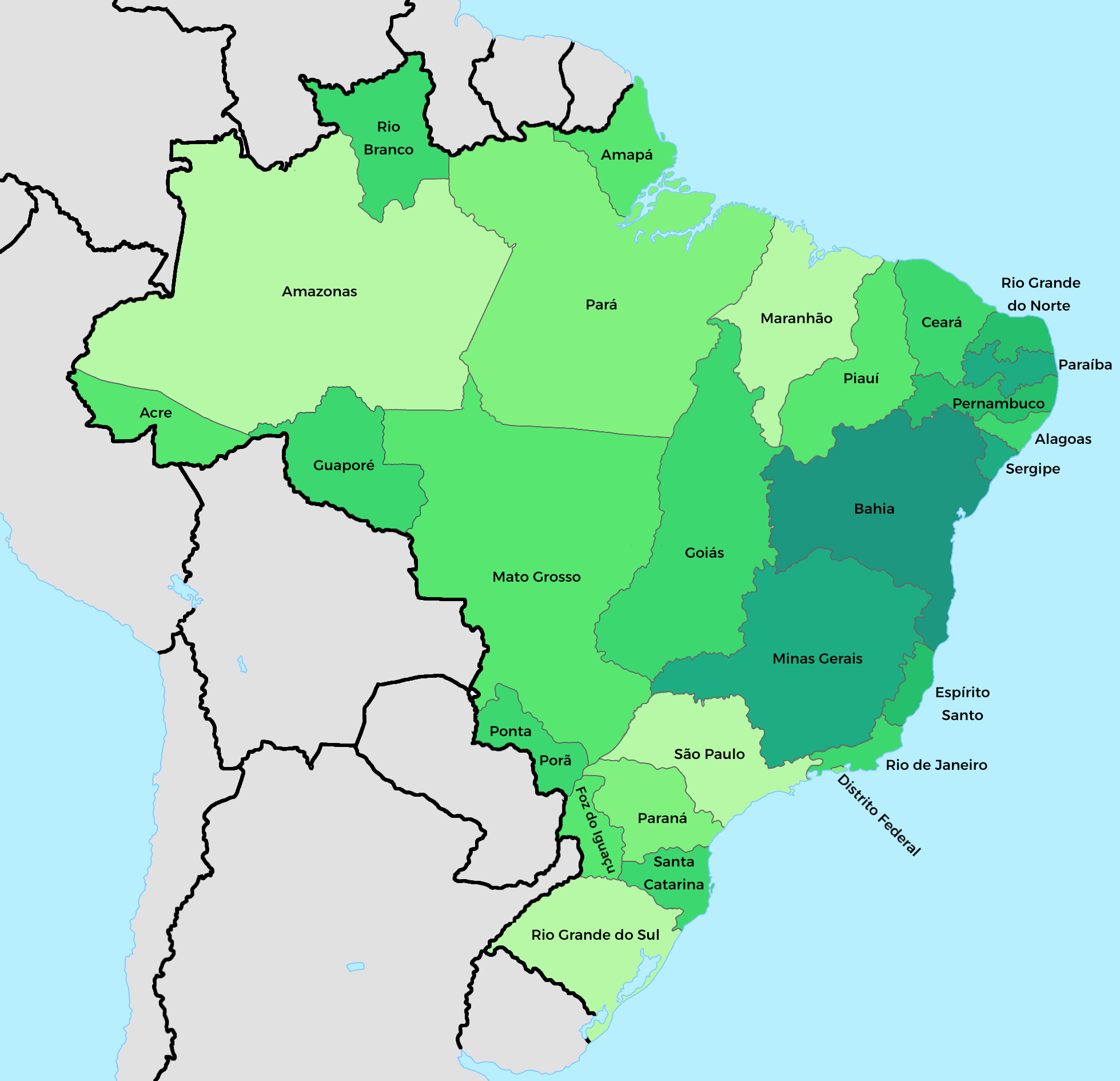
1943
Border territories

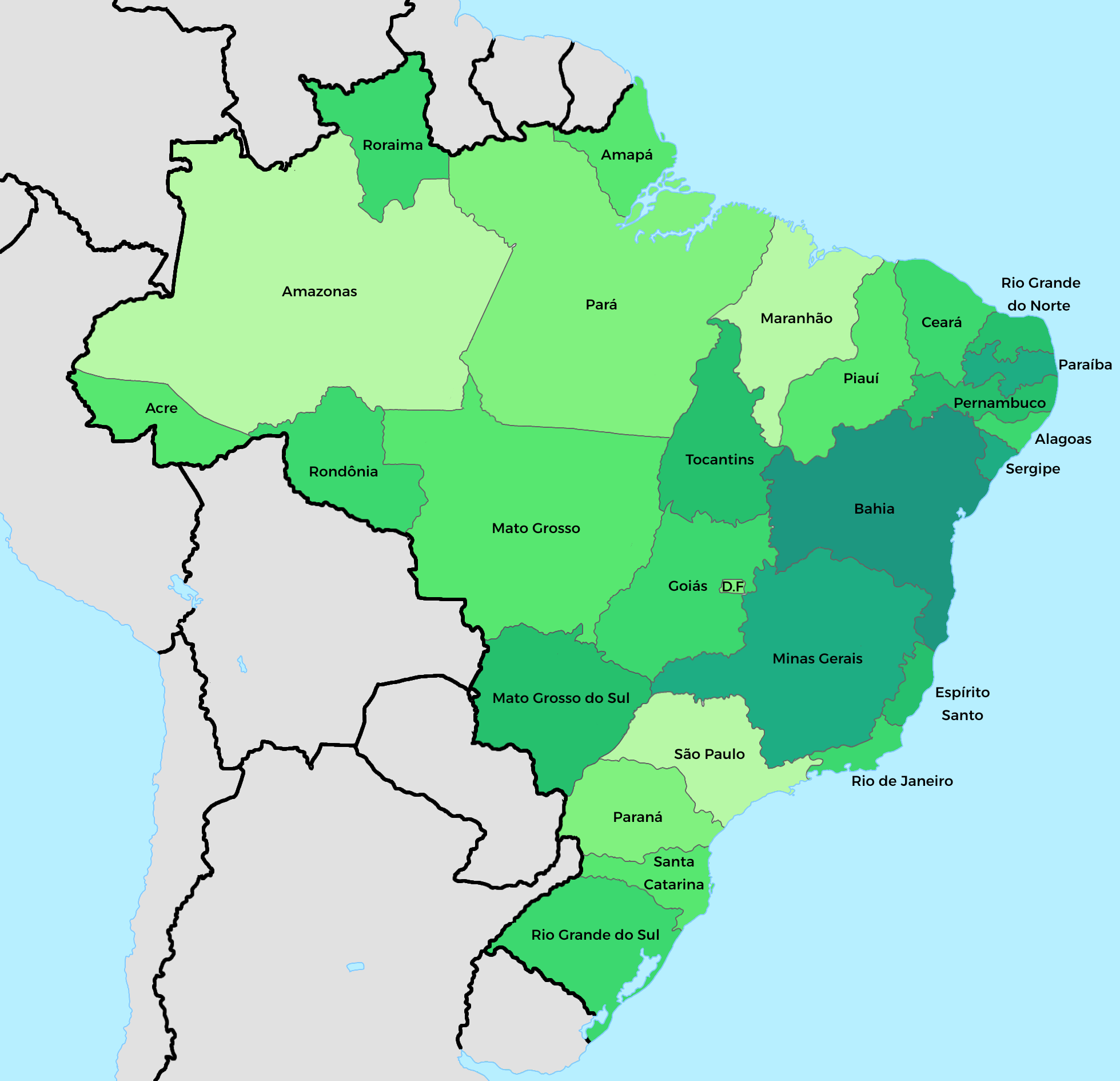
1988
Current states

== List ==
Flag and name	Code	Capital	Area		Population (2026)	Density (2022)		Established (year)	HDI (2024)
Flag and name	Code	Capital	km^{2}	sq mi	Population (2026)	per km^{2}	per sq mi	Established (year)	HDI (2024)
Acre	AC	Rio Branco	164,123	63,368	887,794	6.34	16.4	1962	0.754
Alagoas	AL	Maceió	27,779	10,726	3,221,128	125.52	325.1	1817	0.746
Amapá	AP	Macapá	142,829	55,147	809,953	2.63	6.8	1988	0.759
Amazonas	AM	Manaus	1,559,159	601,995	4,360,926	2.58	6.7	1850	0.767
Bahia	BA	Salvador	564,733	218,045	14,889,472	30.52	79.0	1534	0.759
Ceará	CE	Fortaleza	148,921	57,499	9,302,211	60.33	156.3	1799	0.773
Distrito Federal	DF	Brasília	5,780	2,230	3,009,996	493.00	1,276.9	1960	0.866
Espírito Santo	ES	Vitória	46,096	17,798	4,150,692	80.63	208.8	1810	0.804
Goiás	GO	Goiânia	340,112	131,318	7,495,033	18.46	47.8	1748	0.815
Maranhão	MA	São Luís	331,937	128,162	7,024,557	19.03	49.3	1534	0.745
Mato Grosso	MT	Cuiabá	903,366	348,792	3,950,330	4.01	10.4	1748	0.812
Mato Grosso do Sul	MS	Campo Grande	357,146	137,895	2,946,317	7.83	20.3	1979	0.797
Minas Gerais	MG	Belo Horizonte	586,522	226,457	21,460,311	31.72	82.2	1720	0.809
Pará	PA	Belém	1,247,955	481,838	8,756,324	7.02	18.2	1616	0.758
Paraíba	PB	João Pessoa	56,470	21,800	4,182,828	78.93	204.4	1799	0.760
Paraná	PR	Curitiba	199,308	76,953	11,952,524	43.46	112.6	1853	0.822
Pernambuco	PE	Recife	98,148	37,895	9,583,176	103.83	268.9	1534	0.767
Piauí	PI	Teresina	251,578	97,135	3,392,617	9.73	25.2	1811	0.764
Rio de Janeiro	RJ	Rio de Janeiro	43,780	16,900	17,225,410	387.46	1,003.5	1565	0.819
Rio Grande do Norte	RN	Natal	52,811	20,390	3,463,737	62.74	162.5	1817	0.778
Rio Grande do Sul	RS	Porto Alegre	281,730	108,780	11,233,317	36.84	95.4	1760	0.818
Rondônia	RO	Porto Velho	237,591	91,734	1,757,338	7.34	19.0	1982	0.786
Roraima	RR	Boa Vista	224,301	86,603	761,012	2.54	6.6	1988	0.780
Santa Catarina	SC	Florianópolis	95,736	36,964	8,312,691	69.74	180.6	1821	0.833
São Paulo	SP	São Paulo	248,223	95,839	46,179,008	175.73	455.1	1709	0.838
Sergipe	SE	Aracaju	21,915	8,461	2,307,255	97.64	252.9	1820	0.761
Tocantins	TO	Palmas	277,721	107,229	1,595,994	5.74	14.9	1988	0.797
Brazil	BRA	Brasília	8,510,346	3,285,863	214,211,951	61.6	23.8	1822	0.805

=== Approximate correspondence between historical divisions ===
Approximate correspondence between divisions in selected years
Land of Brazil	State of Maranhão and Grão-Pará	State of Brazil	Empire of Brazil		United States of Brazil		Federative Republic of Brazil		
Land of Brazil	State of Brazil	State of Brazil	Empire of Brazil		United States of Brazil		Federative Republic of Brazil		
1534	1654	1775	1822	1853	1889	1943	1967	1977	1988
captaincies		captaincies general	provinces	provinces	states				
captaincies		captaincies general	provinces	neutral municipality	federal district	federal district			federal district
captaincies		captaincies general	provinces	neutral municipality	federal district	territories			federal district
part of Tierra Firme and New Castile	part of Peru			part of Bolivia		Acre	Acre		
part of Tierra Firme and New Castile	Grão-Pará	Grão-Pará		Amazonas		Amazonas			
part of Tierra Firme and New Castile	Grão-Pará	Grão-Pará		Amazonas		Rio Branco	Roraima		Roraima
part of Tierra Firme and New Castile	Grão-Pará	Grão-Pará		Pará		Pará			
part of Tierra Firme and New Castile	Grão-Pará	Grão-Pará		Pará		Amapá			Amapá
Maranhão (west)	Maranhão	Maranhão	Maranhão						
Maranhão (east)	Maranhão	Maranhão	Piauí						
Ceará	Ceará	Pernambuco	Ceará						
Rio Grande		Pernambuco	Rio Grande do Norte						
Itamaracá	Paraíba	Pernambuco	Paraíba						
São João		Pernambuco	Pernambuco			Fernando de Noronha			Pernambuco
Pernambuco		Pernambuco	Pernambuco			Pernambuco			Pernambuco
Pernambuco		Pernambuco	Alagoas						
Baía de Todos os Santos		Bahia	Sergipe						
Baía de Todos os Santos		Bahia	Bahia						
Ilhéus		Bahia	Bahia						
Porto Seguro		Bahia	Bahia						
Espírito Santo		Bahia	Espírito Santo						
São Tomé	Rio de Janeiro			Rio de Janeiro				Rio de Janeiro	
São Vicente (north)	Rio de Janeiro			Município Neutro	Distrito Federal		Guanabara	Rio de Janeiro	
São Vicente (north)	São Vicente	Minas Gerais							
part of New Castile and New Toledo	São Vicente	Goiás					Goiás		Tocantins
part of New Castile and New Toledo	São Vicente	Goiás					Goiás		Goiás
part of New Castile and New Toledo	São Vicente	Goiás					Distrito Federal		
part of New Castile and New Toledo	São Vicente	Mato Grosso				Guaporé	Rondônia		Rondônia
part of New Castile and New Toledo	São Vicente	Mato Grosso				Mato Grosso	Mato Grosso	Mato Grosso	
part of New Castile and New Toledo	São Vicente	Mato Grosso				Ponta Porã	Mato Grosso	Mato Grosso do Sul	
Santo Amaro	São Vicente	São Paulo		São Paulo					
São Vicente (south)	São Vicente	São Paulo		São Paulo					
São Vicente (south)	São Vicente	São Paulo		Paraná		Paraná	Paraná		
São Vicente (south)	São Vicente	São Paulo		Paraná		Iguaçu	Paraná		
Santana		Rio de Janeiro (dependencies)	Santa Catarina			Iguaçu	Santa Catarina		
Santana		Rio de Janeiro (dependencies)	Santa Catarina			Santa Catarina	Santa Catarina		
part of New Andalusia	part of Peru	Rio de Janeiro (dependencies)	Rio Grande do Sul						
part of New Andalusia	part of Peru	part of Peru	Cisplatina	Uruguay					

== See also ==
- Brazil socio-geographic division
- List of Brazilian states by Human Development Index
- List of Brazilian states by murder rate
- List of Brazil state name etymologies
- Provinces of Brazil
- Regions of Brazil
