= Viceroyalty of Brazil =

Portuguese viceroyalty in Brazil 1763-1815

Viceroyalty of Brazil Vice-Reino do Brasil
- 1763–1808
- Flag of Portugal (1750–1816)
- Status: Viceroyalty of the Portuguese Empire
- Capital: Rio de Janeiro (1763–1808)
- Common languages: Portuguese (official, administrative); Língua Geral; Tupi; Guarani; Jê; Bantu; Yoruba
- Religion: Catholic Church
- Monarch
  - 1763–1777 (first): Joseph I
  - 1777–1808 (last): Maria I
- Viceroy
  - 1763–1764 (first): António de Almeida Soares (Note: The first governor to permanently hold the title of viceroy following its establishment in 1763.)
  - 1806–1808 (last): Marcos de Noronha e Brito
- Historical era: Portuguese Empire
  - Title of viceroy made permanent; capital moved to Rio de Janeiro: 1763
  - Office suppressed with the transfer of the Portuguese court: 1808

[]
  - Census: 1810 - 2,424,641
- Currency: Portuguese real
| Preceded by | Succeeded by |
| State of Brazil; State of Grão-Pará and Maranhão | Kingdom of Brazil |
- Today part of: Brazil

The Viceroyalty of Brazil (Portuguese: Vice-Reino do Brasil) refers, in narrow scope, to office of viceroy of the Portuguese colonial State of Brazil and, in broad scope, to the whole State of Brazil during the historic period when its governors had the title of viceroy. The term "viceroyalty" however never officially designated the title of the colony, which continued to be designated "state". Until 1763, the title "Viceroy" was occasionally granted to some governors of Brazil who were members of the high nobility, with the remaining keeping the title "governor-general". From around 1763, the title "viceroy" became permanent, so being granted to all governors. The position of viceroy was abolished, when the Portuguese court transferred to Brazil in 1808, with the State of Brazil becoming directly administered by the Portuguese Government seated in Rio de Janeiro.

== History ==
Since the 17th century, the title of "viceroy" was granted occasionally to some governors of the State of Brazil, who were members of the Portuguese high nobility, with the first being D. Jorge Mascarenhas, marquis of Montalvão, who assumed the office in 26 May, 1640. The remaining, kept the title of "governor-general".

Around 1763, at the same time that the capital of the State of Brazil was transferred from Salvador to Rio de Janeiro, the title "viceroy" became permanent and, since then, granted to all governors of the State. The driving force for the move was the then tiny village of São Paulo dos Campos de Piratininga, and its capital was made São Sebastião do Rio de Janeiro as a result of the Emboabas' War against Portuguese recent arrivals and colonizers from Bahia, and the consequent shift of economic power to the gold-producing Minas dos Matos Gerais: São Sebastião do Rio de Janeiro was the port where the gold was sent to Portugal, and consequently the point of contact between metropolis and colony.

In 1775, the remaining states of the Portuguese America (Maranhão and Grão-Pará) were integrated in the State of Brazil, becoming under the authority of its viceroy, the capital maintained in Rio de Janeiro.

In 1808, with the Transfer of the Portuguese Court to Brazil, the Prince Regent (future John VI of Portugal) assumed direct control of the government of the State of Brazil, suppressing the office of viceroy. In 1815, the status of the State of Brazil was raised, becoming the Kingdom of Brazil, as one of the constituent kingdoms of the newly created United Kingdom of Portugal, Brazil and the Algarves.

== List of Viceroys of Brazil ==
see : List of governors-general of Brazil

== Composition ==
=== Captaincies from merger of State of Maranhão ===
- Captaincy of Cabo Norte
- Captaincy of Caeté
- Captaincy of Cametá
- Captaincy of Cumã
- Captaincy of Marajó
- Captaincy of Maranhão
- Captaincy of Pará
- Captaincy of Piauí 1759 split from Maranhao
- Captaincy of São José do Rio Negro
- Captaincy of Xingu

== See also ==
- State of Grão-Pará and Maranhão
- Colonial Brazil-related topics
- Prince of Brazil
- State of Brazil
- Captaincies of Brazil
- Kingdom of Brazil
