= Portuguese America =

Predominantly Portuguese-speaking areas of the Americas

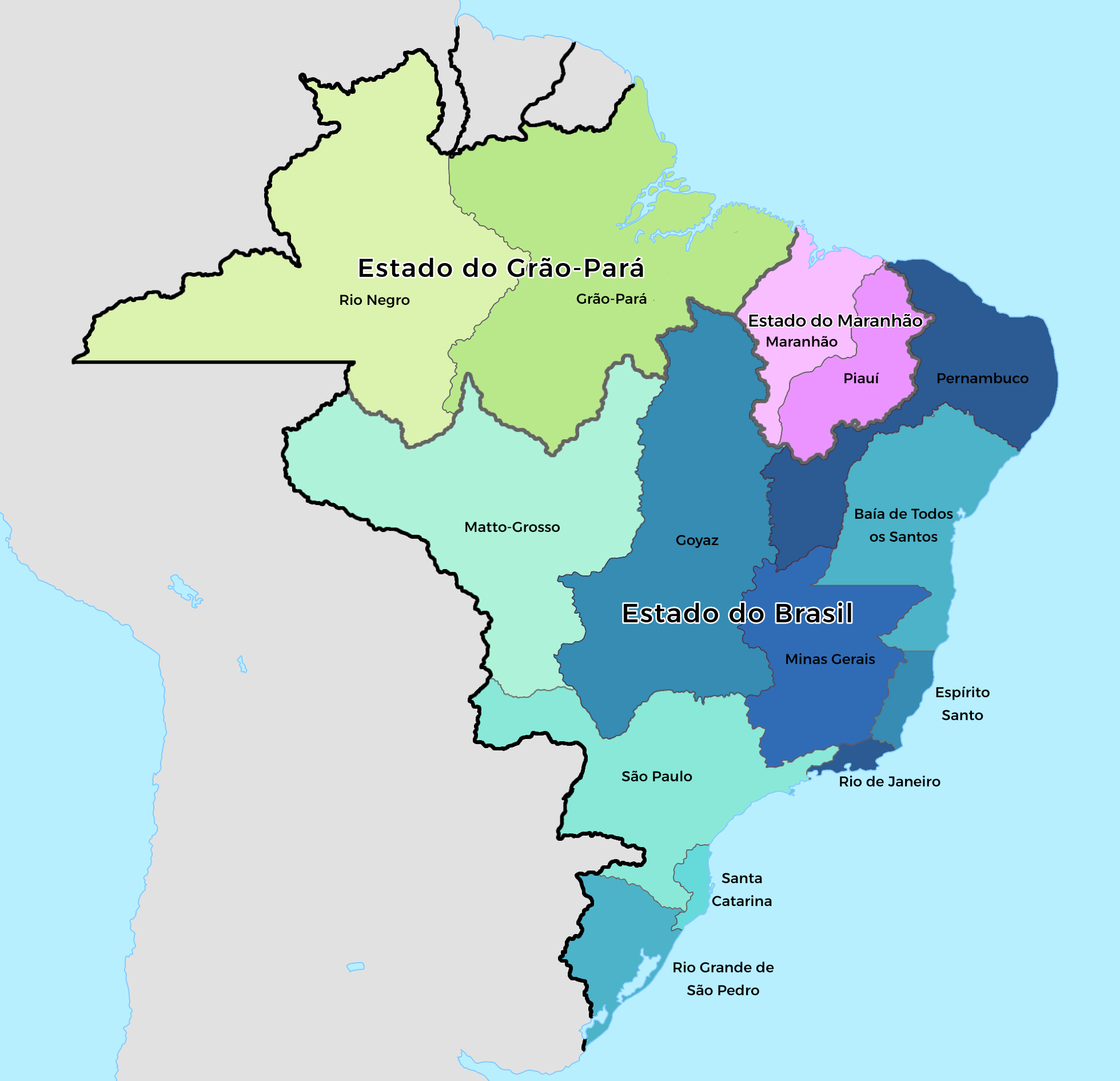
- Portuguese America in 1778, including the States of Grão-Pará (in green), Maranhão (in yellow) and Brazil (in blue)
- Area: 8,515,767 km^{2} (3,287,956 sq mi)
- Population: 203,080,756
- Population density: 23.8/km^{2} (62/sq mi)
- Demonym: Portuguese American; Lusitanic American; Luso American
- Countries: Brazil
- Dependencies: Papiamento: Aruba; Bonaire; Curaçao
- Languages: Portuguese
- Time zones: UTC−02:00 (Brazil) to UTC−05:00 (Brazil)
- Largest cities: Largest urban areas: 1. São Paulo (Brazil); 2. Rio de Janeiro (Brazil); 3. Brasília (Brazil); 4. Fortaleza (Brazil); 5. Salvador (Brazil); 6. Belo Horizonte (Brazil); 7. Manaus (Brazil); 8. Curitiba (Brazil); 9. Recife (Brazil); 10. Goiânia (Brazil)

Portuguese America (Portuguese: América Portuguesa), sometimes called América Lusófona or Lusophone America in the English language, in contrast to British America, French America, or Spanish America, is the Portuguese-speaking community of people and their diaspora, notably those tracing back origins to Brazil and the early Portuguese colonization of the Americas.

Portugal colonized parts of Southern America (Brazil; Colónia do Sacramento, in Uruguay; Guanare, in Venezuela), but also made some unsuccessful attempts to colonize Northern America (Newfoundland and Labrador and Nova Scotia in Canada).

Brazil is the centre of the community and is the point of origin of most of Portuguese America, but it also includes communities all over the Americas and languages derived from Portuguese, notably Papiamento spoken on Aruba, Bonaire, and Curaçao; Saramaccan of Suriname; and Cupópia of Brazil which is nearly extinct.

Because Portuguese is a Romance language, Portuguese America (specifically Brazil) is considered part of Latin America in some sources, but this term more often refers to Hispanic America, since Brazil is not culturally close enough to Hispanic America in general other than by language proximity.

== See also ==
- Lusitanic
- Hispanic and Latino Americans (Latino)
- Lusophone
- Hispanic America
- Ibero-America
- Latin America (Latin Americans)
- Portuguese language
- Portuguese language in the Americas
- Portuguese-language literature
