= Maranhão State =

Maranhão State may refer to:

- Maranhão
- Maranhão (former state), 1621–1751
