= List of Brazil state name etymologies =

The names of most Brazilian states are based on Portuguese placenames, while others are based on indigenous (often Tupi–Guarani) and a few European languages.

State name	Language of origin	Source word	Meaning and Notes
Acre	Tupi	a'quiri or a'kiru,	from a misspelling of Aquiri, a local river, which meaning is "green river"; not from acre (a measurement of area) or Acre (as in the Siege of Acre).
Alagoas	Portuguese		plural of alagoa, a flooded field or swamp
Amapá	Arawak	amapá	"the land in the end" (documented in Sir Walter Raleigh's account of Guyana as Land of Amapaia)
Amazonas	Greek		after the Amazon River, which was named by Spanish explorers who heard rumors that Amazons ("female mounted warriors", possibly from the Iranian ethnonym *ha-mazan-, "warriors"; former supposed etymology—Greek α-μαστός a- mastos, "with no breasts"— is considered false etymology) guarded the legendary city of El Dorado in the middle of the forest
Bahia	Old Portuguese	bahia	bay or harbor; the colonial province was called Bahia de Todos os Santos (All Saints Bay), because it was discovered on November 1, All Saints Day
Ceará	Tupi	sy ara	"mother of the day" or "source of light", because it is a sunny land with sparse vegetation (therefore, few shadows)
Espírito Santo	Portuguese		"Holy Ghost/Spirit"
Goiás	Tupi	goyaz	Apparently, the name originated from the name of Tupi goiaiase nation that occupied the region in the late 16th century the term gwa ya mean "equal individual ", and therefore able to be friends .
Maranhão	Portuguese		Portuguese spelling of Marañón, another name for the Amazon River; from 1621 to 1709, the north of Brazil was styled the State of Maranhão, with its capital at São Luís
Mato Grosso	Portuguese	Matto Grosso	"thick grass" or "dense woods"
Mato Grosso do Sul	Portuguese		a new state created in 1975 from the southern part of Mato Grosso state, its name means "thick grass/dense woods of the south"
Minas Gerais	Early Modern Portuguese	Minas Geraes	"General Mines"; separated from São Paulo in 1709 and placed under the direct control of the Portuguese Crown as the Captaincy of São Paulo and the Mines, after the discovery of gold, diamonds, and gems in the territory
Pará	Tupi-Guaraní	pará	river; probably because of the estuary of the Amazon River. The Pará River, near the state capital Belém, would be "River River".
Paraíba	Old Tupi	parahiba	pará (river) + aíba (rough, bad), probably meaning "rough river"
Paraná	Guarani	paraná	"wide river"; the words for "river", "large river", "lagoon", "sea" and "lake" have different meanings in Tupi, leading to confusion that Paraná meant sea
Pernambuco	Tupi	paranambuka	paranã (sea) + mbuka (hollow), referring to the coastal reefs; the state capital, Recife, is derived from the Portuguese for reef
Piauí	Tupi	piauhi	piau (a type of river fish) and y (river), so Piau Fish River
Rio de Janeiro	Portuguese		"River of January"; the city harbor was discovered on January 1, 1502, and was believed to be the mouth of a river (such as the Tagus estuary which forms a bay by Lisbon). The state was named after the city, now its capital.
Rio Grande do Norte	Portuguese		"Great River of the North"; Rio Grande was the original Portuguese name of the Potenji River
Rio Grande do Sul	Portuguese		"Great River of the South"; the long and narrow Patos Lagoon (lagoon of the ducks) was probably mistaken for a river; thus the name of the first important settlement in the state, the town of Rio Grande
Rondônia			after Marshal Cândido Rondon, explorer of the region; the old name for the state was Guaporé, Tupi for "pathway to the lake"
Roraima	Yanomaman	roro imã	"thundering mountain" according to some sources; the old name for the state was Rio Branco, Portuguese for "white river"
Santa Catarina	Portuguese	Santa Catharina	after Saint Catherine of Alexandria
São Paulo	Portuguese		after the Jesuit monastery of São Paulo dos Campos de Piratininga (Saint Paul of the Fields of Piratininga), built to Christianize native peoples; the state was named after its capital
Sergipe	Tupi	siri jibe	after the name of a native chief, Serijipe; another possible origin is from the Tupi siri jibe, a "brook with crabs"
Tocantins	Tupi	tukantin	tukan (toucan, a South American bird) + tin (nose), or nose of toucan; the confluence of the Araguaia and Tocantins rivers is shaped like a bird's beak; the region is also named "Bico do Papagaio" (Parrot Beak), however, the river had this name long before maps revealed the shape of the confluence
Distrito Federal	Portuguese		lit. "Federal District"; formerly the municipal territory of the national capital was called either Município Neutro (Neutral Municipality, from 1834 to 1889), Corte Imperial (Imperial Court, from 1822 to 1834) or Capital Federal (Federal Capital, from 1889 to 1934)

== See also ==
- States of Brazil
