= List of states of the Portuguese Empire =

This is a list of territories of the Portuguese Empire (Portuguese: Império Português), that at various times were officially called "states" (estados):

- State of India (Estado da Índia) (1505–1961)
- State of Brazil (Estado do Brasil) (1621–1815)
- State of Maranhão (Estado do Maranhão) (1621–1751)
- State of Grão-Pará and Maranhão (Estado do Grão-Pará e Maranhão) (1751–1772)
- State of Grão-Pará and Rio Negro (Estado do Grão-Pará e Rio Negro) (1772–1775)
- State of Maranhão and Piauí (Estado do Maranhão e Piauí) (1772–1775)
- State of Eastern Africa (Estado da África Oriental) (1891-1893)
- State of Angola (Estado de Angola) (1972–1975)
- State of Mozambique (Estado de Moçambique) (1972–1975)
