= State of Brazil =

1621–1815 state of the Portuguese Empire

State of Brazil Estado do Brasil
- 1548–1815
- Coat of arms

- The State of Brazil in 1750
- Status: State of the Portuguese Empire
- Capital: Salvador (1645–1763); Rio de Janeiro (1763–1815)
- Common languages: Portuguese
- Religion: Roman Catholicism
- Government: Dependent territory under an absolute monarchy
- Monarch
  - 1521–1557: John III (first)
  - 1777–1816: Maria I (last)
- Governor General/Viceroy
  - 1549–1553: Tomé de Sousa (first)
  - 1806–1808: Count of Arcos (last)
- History
  - End of hereditary captaincies: 1548
  - Transference of the capital to Rio de Janeiro: 1763
  - Inconfidência Mineira: 1792
  - Transfer of the Portuguese court to Brazil: 22 January 1808
  - Elevation of Brazil to Kingdom: 16 December 1815
- Currency: Portuguese Real
Preceded by
Governorate General of Brazil
State of Grão-Pará and Rio Negro
State of Maranhão and Piauí
1654: Dutch Brazil
Succeeded by
1630: Dutch Brazil
1815: United Kingdom of Portugal, Brazil, and the Algarves
Kingdom of Brazil

The State of Brazil (Portuguese: Estado do Brasil) or Government-General of Brazil was one of the states (an administrative division) of the Portuguese Empire in the Americas during the period of Colonial Brazil. (Note: Historiographical designation, but not a formal one, used to describe the ensemble of kingdoms, states and other lordships, European and overseas, that constituted the domains of the Portuguese Crown.) It was in force between 1548 and 1815. Created in the context of the reorganization of the Portuguese imperial system in the Atlantic, its central purpose was to centralize the administration of the hereditary captaincies, ensure the defense of the territory, and consolidate royal authority over the southern portion of the Crown's American domains.

Established during the reign of John III of Portugal, the State of Brazil had as its first capital the city of Salvador, seat of the Government-General of Brazil, the body responsible for the political, military, fiscal, and judicial coordination of the territory. Throughout its existence, the entity underwent successive administrative reorganizations, including temporary divisions into regional governments and the separation of northern areas, which gave rise to the State of Maranhão.

From a juridical-administrative point of view, the State of Brazil was not designated in royal documents as a "colony", but rather as a "state", "domain", or "conquest", terms characteristic of the administrative language of the Portuguese Empire in the Ancien Régime. The modern notion of colony, associated with a rigid hierarchical relationship between metropolis and subordinate territory, was constructed later by historiography, especially from the nineteenth century onward, and does not correspond directly to the normative terminology employed by the Portuguese Crown.

From the seventeenth century onward, especially after the creation of the Overseas Council in 1642, the State of Brazil became more structurally integrated into the administrative system of the empire, maintaining a direct relationship with the Portuguese Crown. Although its governors progressively adopted the title of viceroy from the eighteenth century onward, the official designation of the unit remained unchanged, and from a juridical-administrative standpoint no formal viceroyalty was constituted.

In 1763, in the context of the economic and strategic centrality of the south-central region of Portuguese America, the capital of the State of Brazil was transferred from Salvador to Rio de Janeiro, which became the principal political center of the Portuguese domain in the Americas. From 1808 onward, with the Transfer of the Portuguese court to Brazil, the territory came to host the Portuguese monarchy itself, implying profound institutional transformations and the reconfiguration of relations traditionally described as colonial.

The State of Brazil was formally extinguished in 1815, when it was elevated to the category of the Kingdom of Brazil, with a status equivalent to that of the kingdoms of Portugal and the Algarves, becoming part of the United Kingdom of Portugal, Brazil and the Algarves. This elevation marked the end of the colonial administrative model of the Ancien Régime and constituted a decisive milestone in the political transition that would culminate in the Independence of Brazil.

== Formation and historical context ==
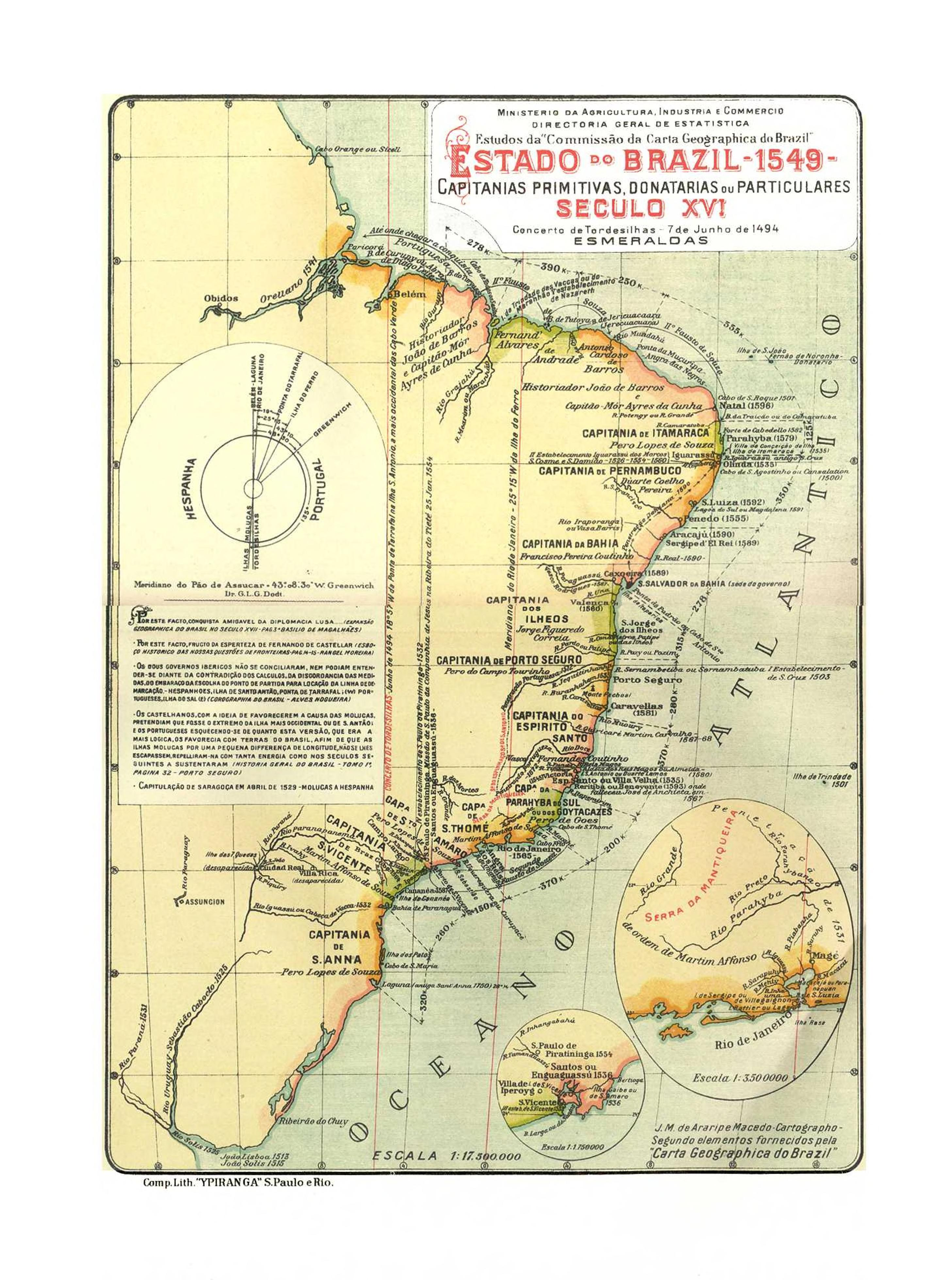
Map of the State of Brazil in 1549, highlighting the administrative centralization under the Government-General headquartered in Salvador.

Areas under the jurisdiction of the State of Brazil in 1548, the year of its creation.

=== Portuguese colonization in the Americas ===
The Portuguese occupation of the Americas, formally initiated from 1530 onward, was initially structured through the system of hereditary captaincies, inspired by earlier experiences of the Portuguese Crown in the Atlantic. This decentralized model transferred broad administrative, judicial, and economic powers to private donatários, with the aim of reducing the costs of colonization and accelerating the settlement of the territory.

Despite some cases of relative success, notably in the captaincies of Pernambuco and São Vicente, the system proved largely ineffective. Scarcity of resources, Indigenous resistance, communication difficulties, precarious military defense, and the limited administrative capacity of the donatários compromised the consolidation of Portuguese rule over much of the territory.

At the same time, the intensification of colonial disputes in the Atlantic, especially the French presence on the Brazilian coast, revealed the fragility of the existing model and the need for greater direct intervention by the Crown in American administration.

=== Creation of the State of Brazil ===
In this context, the Portuguese Crown promoted, in 1548, a profound administrative reorganization of Portuguese America with the creation of the State of Brazil. The measure was formalized through the regimento that established the office of Governor-General of Brazil, the king's direct representative in the territory, charged with coordinating the civil, military, fiscal, and judicial administration of the captaincies.

The city of Salvador was chosen as the seat of the new administrative apparatus because of its strategic position on the Atlantic coast and its centrality in relation to the captaincies then in existence. The founding of the city and the installation of the government-general under the leadership of Tomé de Sousa marked the beginning of a more centralized and hierarchical administration aimed at consolidating royal power and integrating the colonial territory.

The creation of the State of Brazil did not imply the immediate extinction of the hereditary captaincies but redefined their position within the colonial structure. From that point onward, the donatários became subject to the authority of the governor-general, forming a hybrid system in which elements of seigneurial decentralization and royal administrative centralization coexisted.

== Political-administrative organization ==
=== The Government-General of Brazil ===
The creation of the State of Brazil was directly associated with the establishment of the Government-General of Brazil, conceived as the principal instrument of administrative centralization in Portuguese America. The governor-general acted as the Crown's direct representative, exercising broad responsibilities in the political, military, fiscal, and judicial spheres, with the aim of coordinating the actions of the captaincies and ensuring the application of metropolitan directives.

Although the regimento of 1548 granted extensive powers to the governor-general, his authority was not absolute. The exercise of colonial government took place in a context marked by constant negotiation among different spheres of power, including donatários, municipal councils, religious orders, and local economic agents, which gave the administrative system a plural and adaptive character.

Throughout the sixteenth and seventeenth centuries, the Government-General consolidated itself as the organizing axis of colonial administration, responsible for articulating relations between the Crown and local elites as well as coordinating policies of defense, justice, and fiscal collection on a broad territorial scale.

=== Administrative structure ===
The administration of the State of Brazil was structured around a set of royal offices whose responsibilities were defined by specific regimentos and articulated hierarchically. In addition to the governor-general, the ouvidor-geral, responsible for the administration of justice; the provedor-mor da fazenda, in charge of the collection and management of fiscal resources; and military officers responsible for the defense of the territory and the coast stood out.

This structure reflected the Crown's effort to transpose to the colonial sphere administrative practices of the Portuguese Ancien Régime, adapting them to the specific conditions of America. The overlap of competencies and the coexistence of distinct jurisdictions were recurrent characteristics of the system, resulting in frequent conflicts of attribution but also in mechanisms of institutional balance.

The administration of the State of Brazil relied less on a rigid hierarchical chain and more on a system of overlapping jurisdictions typical of Ancien Régime monarchies. This configuration allowed the Crown to exercise formal authority over vast territories with limited administrative resources while depending on the mediation of local elites for the effective implementation of royal policies.

=== Relationship with the Overseas Council ===
The creation of the Overseas Council in 1642 represented a milestone in the administration of the Portuguese Empire and had a direct impact on the functioning of the State of Brazil. From then on, the colonial government reported more systematically to this body, which was responsible for advising the monarch on the formulation and execution of policies concerning overseas domains.

The Overseas Council functioned as an intermediary body between the governor-general and the king, analyzing appointments, administrative conflicts, fiscal and military matters, and issuing opinions on the territorial and institutional organization of the colony. This relationship reinforced decision-making centralization without eliminating the practical autonomy of local authorities, a fundamental characteristic of Portuguese colonial governability.

== Territorial dynamics and administrative divisions ==
=== First administrative division (1572–1577) ===
The first major territorial reorganization of the Government-General or the State of Brazil occurred in 1572, when the Portuguese Crown instituted two distinct governments-general, known as the Government-General of Salvador (or of the North) and the Government-General of Rio de Janeiro (or of the South). The measure responded to the perception that the vastness of the territory, combined with communication and defense difficulties, compromised the effectiveness of the centralized administration headquartered in Salvador.

The Government of the North maintained its seat in Salvador and encompassed the captaincies located between Porto Seguro and Maranhão, while the Government of the South had its capital in Rio de Janeiro and administered the southern captaincies within the limits of the Treaty of Tordesillas. Both governments were formally equivalent and reported directly to the Crown, without any relationship of subordination between them.

Despite the administrative intentions, the experiment proved limited. The division did not eliminate jurisdictional conflicts nor significantly strengthen coastal defense, particularly in the face of foreign incursions and Indigenous resistance. In 1577, the Crown decided to reunify the colonial government under a single authority, restoring administrative centralization in Salvador.

=== The Iberian Union and new reorganizations ===
During the period of the Iberian Union (1580–1640), the State of Brazil was affected by transformations resulting from the integration of the Portuguese and Spanish crowns. The strategic priorities of the Hispanic Monarchy and the intensification of colonial disputes in the South Atlantic led to new attempts at administrative reorganization, including a temporary division between 1602 and 1612.

These experiences reinforced the perception that the governability of the territory depended on flexible solutions capable of reconciling normative centralization with adaptation to local realities. Portuguese colonial administration thus developed a model characterized by the coexistence of rigid formal structures and negotiated administrative practices.

=== Creation of the State of Maranhão (1621) ===
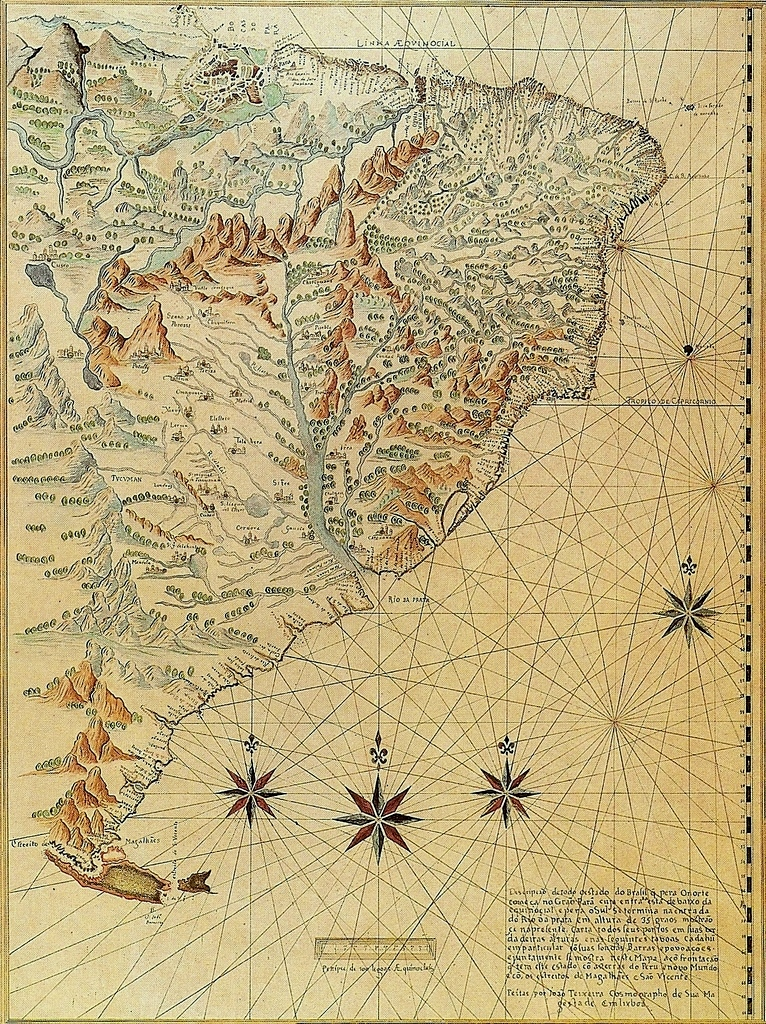
Map of 1612 representing the administrative division of Portuguese America between the State of Brazil and the northern conquests.

In 1621, the Portuguese Crown carried out a new and long-lasting administrative division of Portuguese America with the creation of the State of Maranhão, an autonomous unit equivalent to the State of Brazil. The measure aimed to ensure effective control over the northern regions, strengthen defense against foreign powers, and stimulate the occupation and economic exploitation of the Amazon.

The State of Maranhão, initially with its capital in São Luís, came to encompass the captaincies of Maranhão, Grão-Pará, and Ceará, reporting directly to the king through the Overseas Council. The State of Brazil, in turn, maintained administration over the captaincies located south of this division, consolidating itself as the principal administrative unit of Portuguese America.

Throughout the seventeenth century and the first half of the eighteenth century, the State of Maranhão underwent successive territorial and administrative reconfigurations, including changes of capital and designation. Despite these alterations, the two units remained formally independent from each other until the end of the colonial period, reflecting the Portuguese strategy of administrative fragmentation as an instrument of imperial control.

== Capitality and centers of power ==
=== Salvador as capital of the State of Brazil ===
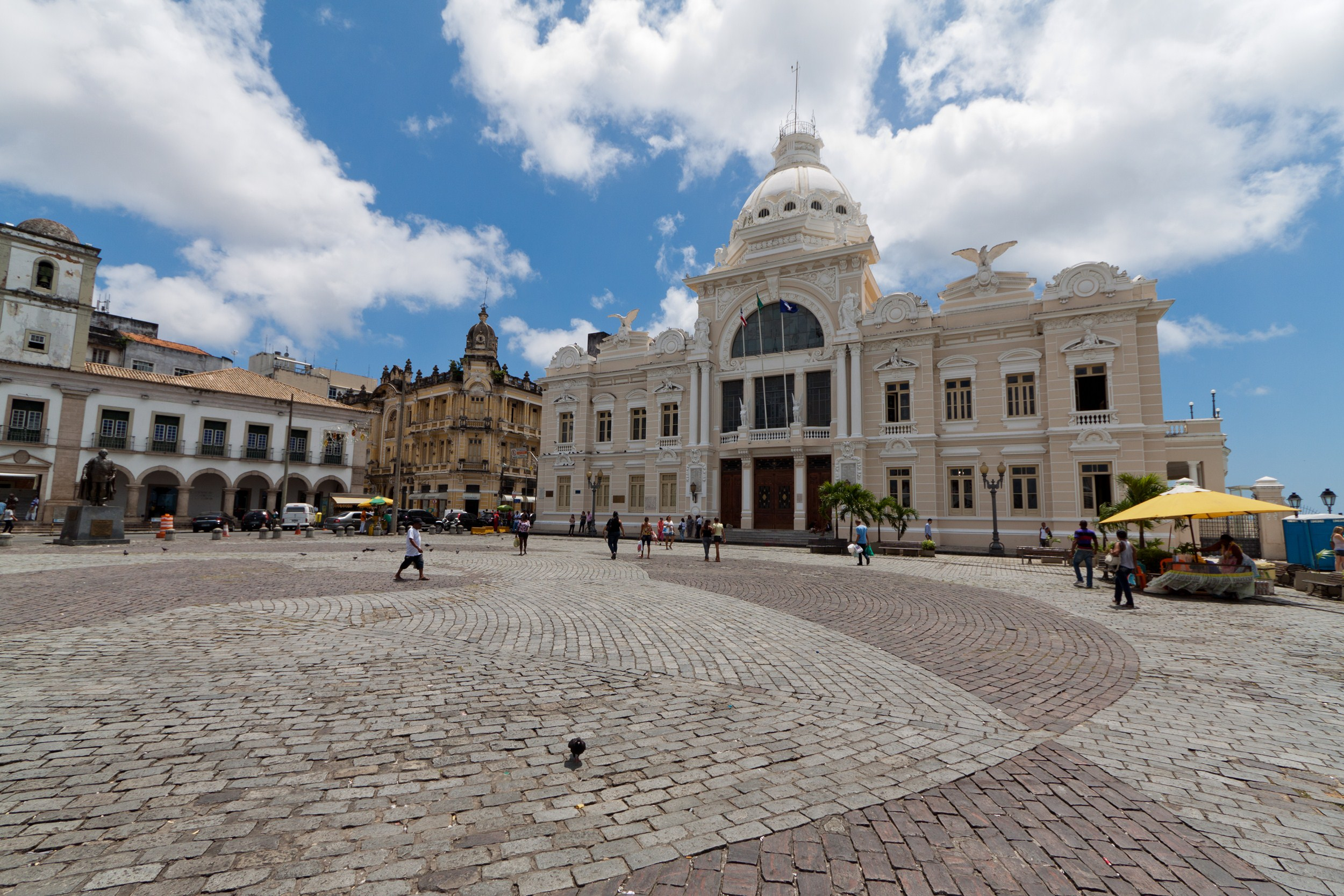
Praça Tomé de Sousa in Salvador, location of the former Casa do Governo, seat of the Government-General of the State of Brazil between 1549 and 1763.

Since the creation of the State of Brazil in 1548, the city of Salvador was established as the seat of the Government-General and the principal political-administrative center of Portuguese America. The choice of the locality was associated with its strategic position on the Atlantic coast, its relative centrality in relation to the captaincies then in existence, and the ease of communication with the metropolis.

As capital, Salvador concentrated the principal institutions of colonial government, including the bodies of justice, finance, and defense, in addition to housing the archbishopric and playing a central role in the articulation between the Crown, local elites, and religious orders. This condition gave the city a lasting symbolic and political role that remained even after the transfer of the capital to Rio de Janeiro from 1763 onward.

=== Olinda as provisional seat ===
During the first phase of the Dutch invasions of Brazil, in 1624 and 1625, the occupation of Salvador by the forces of the Dutch West India Company led to the provisional transfer of the seat of government of the State of Brazil to Olinda. In this exceptional context, colonial administration was exercised from the Captaincy of Pernambuco, under the leadership of the governor-general Matias de Albuquerque.

The choice of Olinda reflected both its economic importance and its strategic position in the northeast of the colony. With the end of the Dutch occupation of Salvador, the capital returned to Bahia, demonstrating the circumstantial character of this transfer and the enduring political centrality of the city during the colonial period.

=== Transfer of the capital to Rio de Janeiro ===
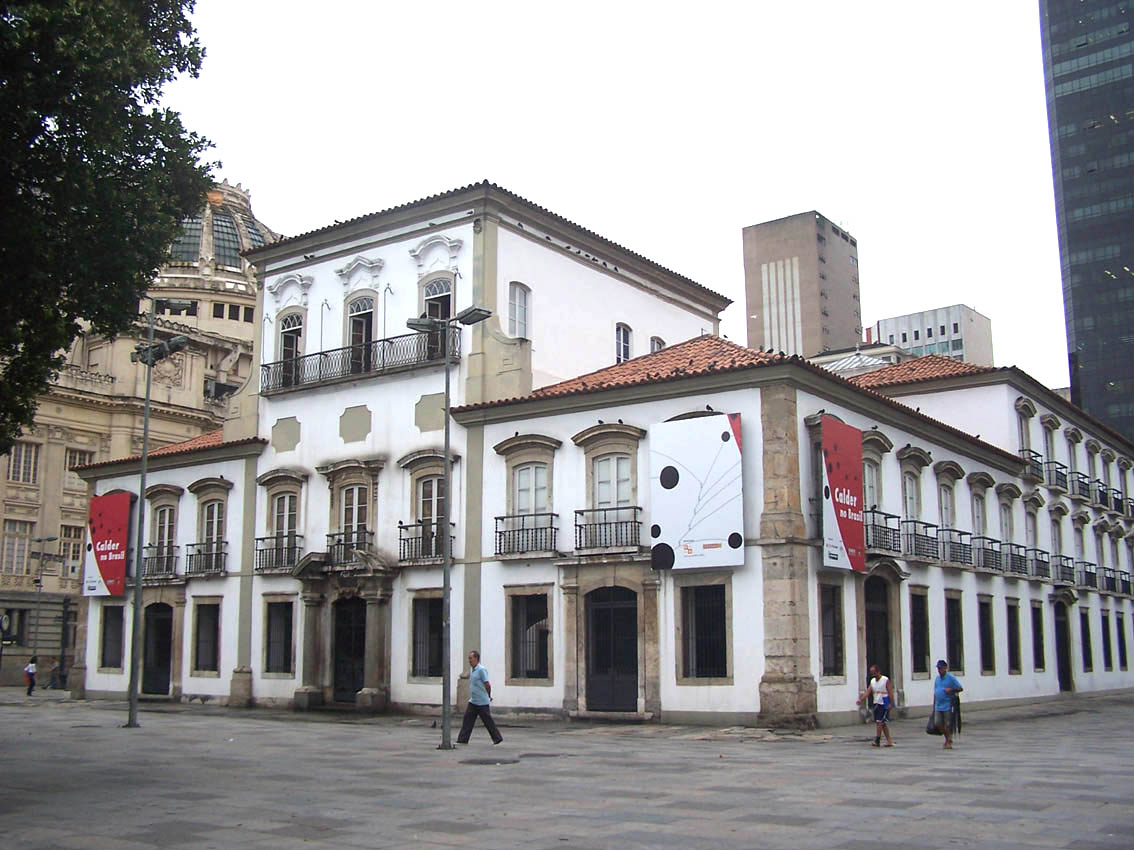
The Paço dos Vice-Reis, today the Paço Imperial, administrative seat of the State of Brazil in Rio de Janeiro after 1763.

Throughout the eighteenth century, profound economic and territorial transformations altered the internal balance of the State of Brazil. The expansion of gold mining in Minas Gerais and the growing importance of the south-central regions favored the rise of Rio de Janeiro as the principal economic, military, and logistical axis of the colony.

In 1763, in the context of the administrative reforms promoted by the Marquis of Pombal, the Portuguese Crown ordered the transfer of the capital of the State of Brazil from Salvador to Rio de Janeiro. The change aimed to reinforce control over the mining regions, improve the defense of the southern coast, and rationalize colonial administration at a time of intensified imperial disputes.

From then on, Rio de Janeiro consolidated itself as the principal political center of Portuguese America, a condition reinforced in 1808 with the Transfer of the Portuguese court to Brazil. The new capital status helped redefine the urban and administrative hierarchies of the territory, anticipating transformations that would culminate in the extinction of the State of Brazil and the elevation of the territory to the condition of the kingdom.

== Legal status and denominations ==
=== The concept of "state" in the Portuguese Empire ===
The designation "State of Brazil" belongs to the administrative tradition of the Portuguese Empire, in which the term "state" was used to designate large overseas territorial units endowed with their own political-administrative organization and directly subordinate to the Crown. Unlike the modern meaning of a sovereign state, the Portuguese notion of "state" in the Ancien Régime referred to an administrative circumscription integrated into the ensemble of royal domains.

In this sense, the State of Brazil did not constitute an autonomous political entity but rather a colonial administrative unit equivalent to other Portuguese imperial formations such as the Estado da Índia and the State of Maranhão. Its official denomination remained unchanged throughout its existence despite institutional transformations and the progressive expansion of the powers of its governors.

In this sense, the State of Brazil should be understood as an administrative unit integrated into the ensemble of royal domains, endowed with its own status but without political sovereignty. Its existence reflects the Portuguese imperial logic of territorial organization, based on differentiated statutes and institutional adaptation to local realities rather than a homogeneous or uniformly subordinate colonial model.

=== The title of viceroy and the so-called "Viceroyalty of Brazil" ===
From the beginning of the eighteenth century onward, it became frequent for the governor-general of the State of Brazil to be granted the title of viceroy, especially after 1720. The use of this title reflected the practical expansion of the royal representative's responsibilities, particularly in the military and diplomatic spheres, in a context of greater administrative complexity and intensified international disputes.

Despite this, the adoption of the title of viceroy did not imply the formal creation of a viceroyalty. From a juridical and administrative standpoint, the State of Brazil did not have its status altered and remained officially designated as a "state". The absence of a normative act formally elevating the territory to the condition of a viceroyalty has led contemporary historiography to treat the expression "Viceroyalty of Brazil" as an anachronistic or merely descriptive denomination without institutional validity.

=== The title of Prince of Brazil and the notion of a "Principality" ===
In 1645, a royal charter instituted the title of Prince of Brazil for the heir to the Portuguese Crown, in analogy to the title of Prince of Portugal. This innovation had an exclusively dynastic and honorific character and did not imply any modification in the juridical or administrative status of the American territory.

The State of Brazil became a Viceroyalty in January 1763, when the capital of the State of Brazil was transferred from São Salvador to Rio de Janeiro.

From the twentieth century onward, some authors began to employ the expression "Principality of Brazil" to refer to the late colonial period. Such usage, however, finds no support in normative documentation nor in the administrative practice of the Portuguese Ancien Régime. Specialized historiography considers this denomination inappropriate, since Brazil was never formally constituted as a principality and remained, until 1815, under the official designation of the State of Brazil.

== Crisis of the colonial system and extinction ==
=== The transfer of the Portuguese court to Brazil ===
In 1808, in the context of the Napoleonic Wars and the invasion of Portugal by French troops, the transfer of the Portuguese court to Rio de Janeiro provoked a decisive rupture in the functioning of the colonial system. The installation of the monarchy in American territory profoundly altered the relations between metropolis and colony, shifting the effective center of the Portuguese Empire to the State of Brazil.

The presence of the court implied the practical extinction of the office of viceroy and the direct subordination of the former colonial administrative structures to the resident monarch. Measures such as the opening of the ports to friendly nations and the reorganization of fiscal, judicial, and military institutions indicated the exhaustion of the colonial model based on the metropolitan exclusive.

These transformations expanded the political and economic autonomy of the American territory while also integrating more closely regions previously considered peripheral, such as the Amazon, into the decision-making center of the empire.

=== Elevation to the Kingdom of Brazil (1815) ===
In 1815, at the end of the Napoleonic Wars and in the context of the diplomatic negotiations of the Congress of Vienna, the prince regent João VI formally elevated the State of Brazil to the category of a kingdom. The measure was established by royal charter, which instituted the Kingdom of Brazil as a legal entity equivalent to the kingdoms of Portugal and the Algarves.

With this decision, the State of Brazil was officially extinguished and incorporated into a new political configuration: the United Kingdom of Portugal, Brazil and the Algarves. The elevation represented the juridical recognition of transformations that had already been taking place since 1808, consolidating the shift of the imperial axis to America and ending the colonial administrative cycle that had begun in 1548.

From a historiographical standpoint, the extinction of the State of Brazil is interpreted as a fundamental milestone in the transition from the colonial ancien régime to new forms of political organization that would culminate, a few years later, in the definitive rupture with Portugal and the formation of the Brazilian national state.

== Gallery ==
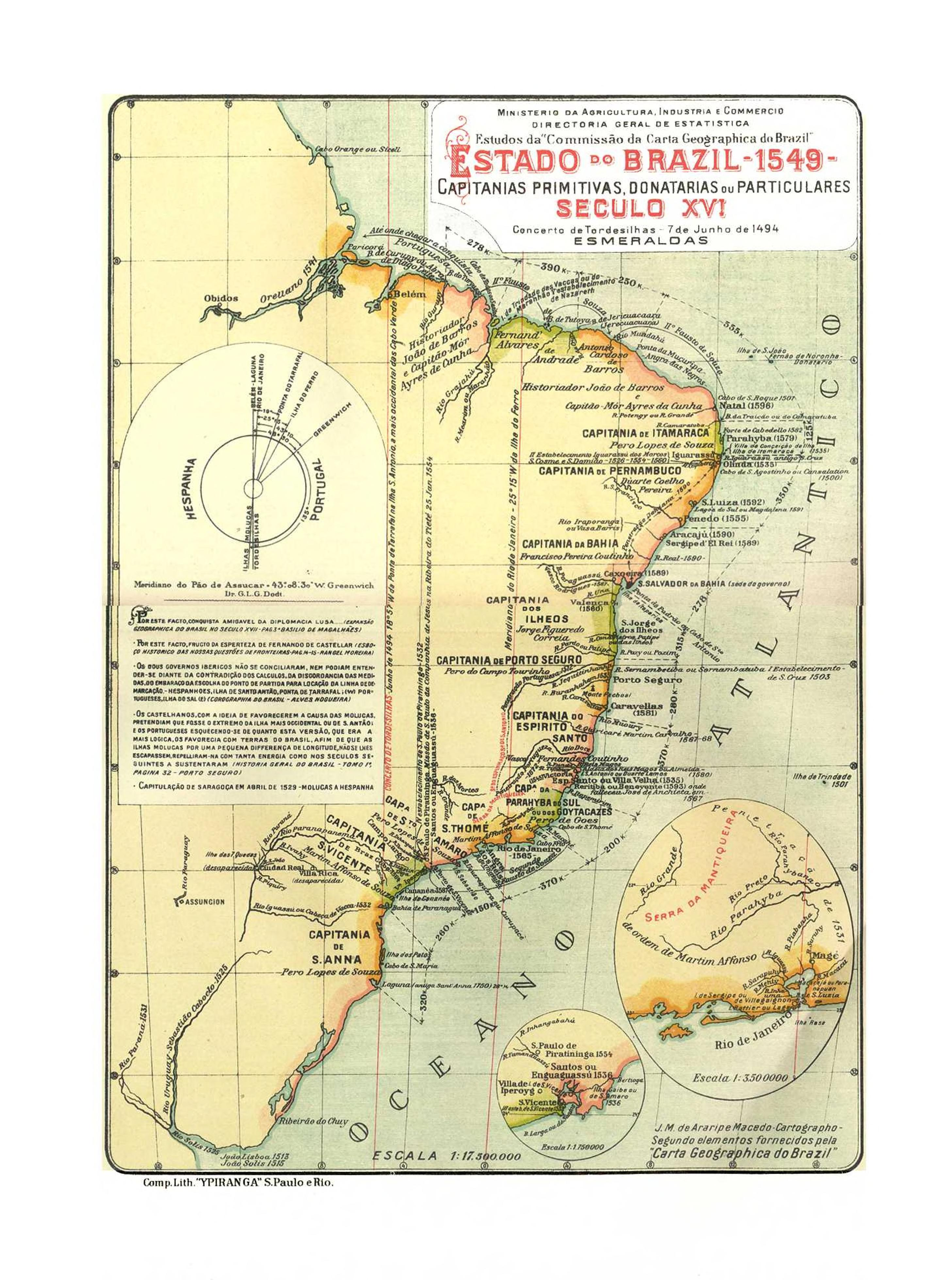
State of Brazil, 1549.

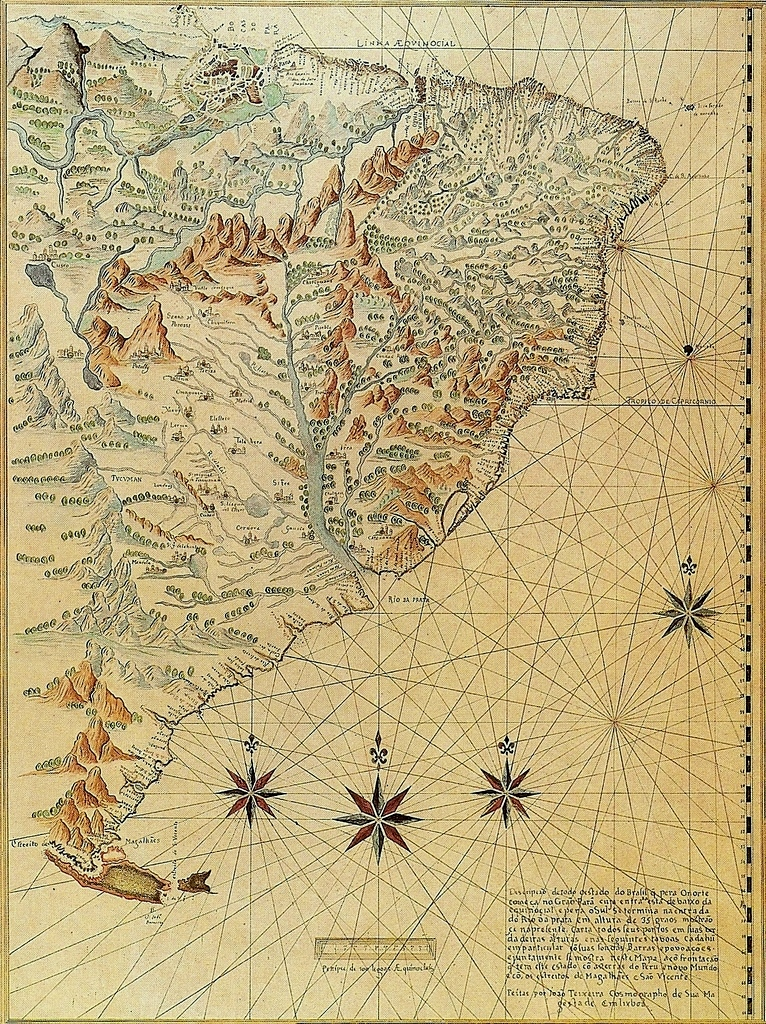
Descripção de todo o Estado do Brasil..., map of 1612.

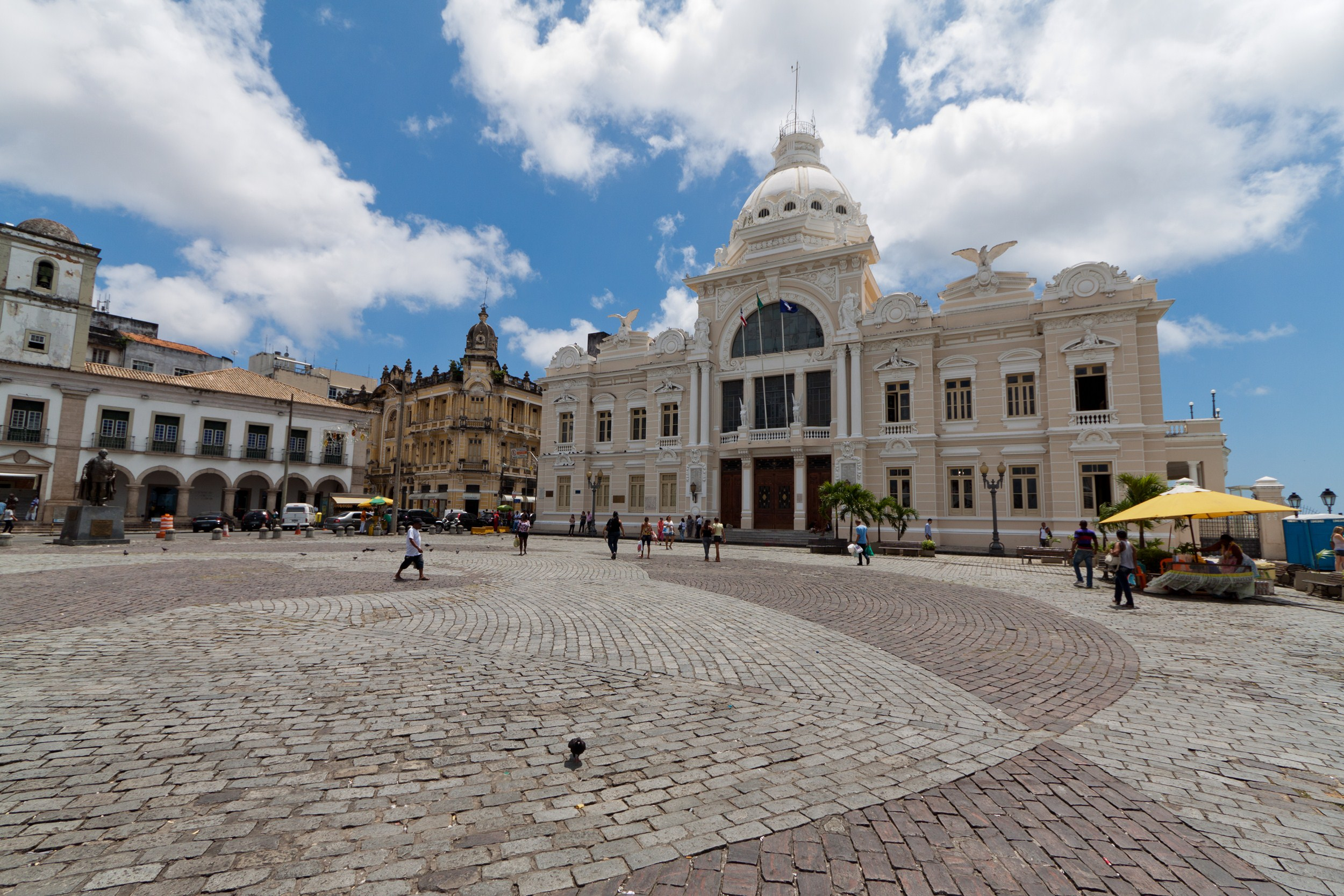
Rio Branco Palace (Salvador) of 1919 at Praça Tomé de Sousa, where the former Casa do Governo stood, seat of the government-general of the State of Brazil (from 1549 to 1763).

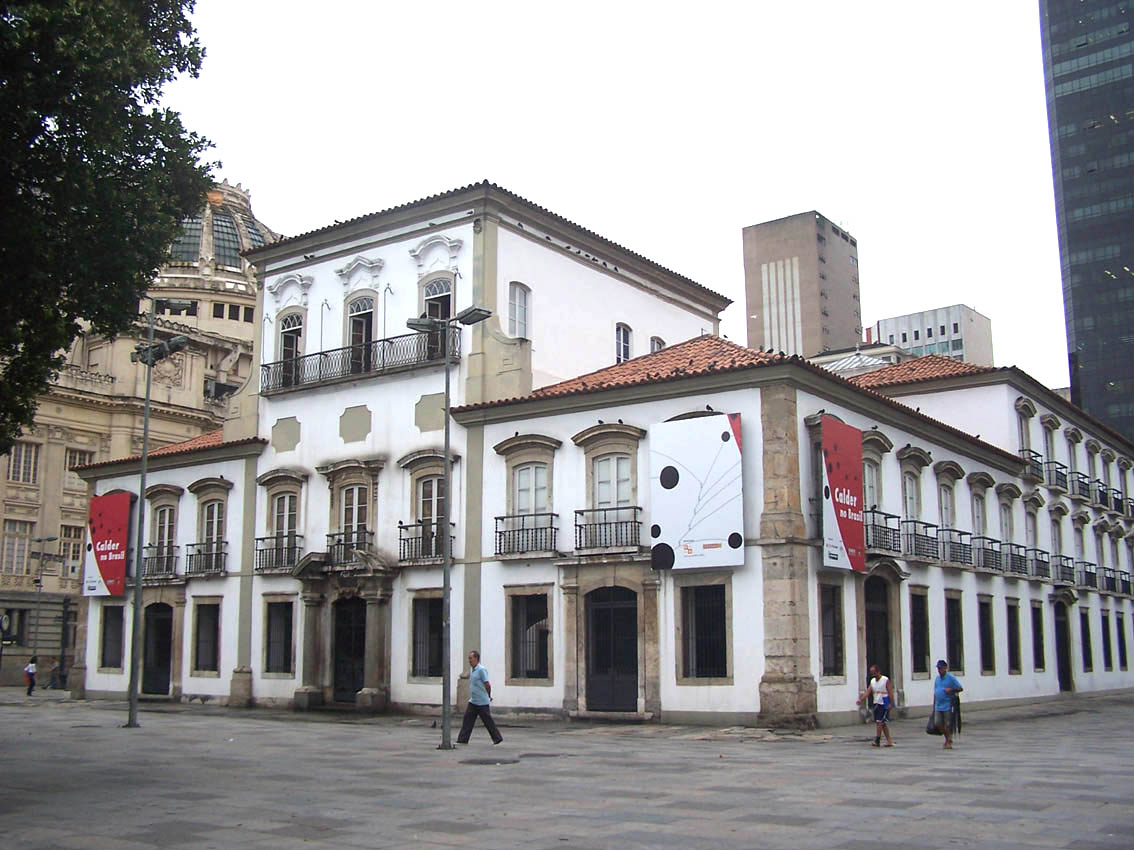
Built in Rio in 1743, the Casa dos Governadores (today Paço Imperial) was the residence of the governors of the Captaincy of Rio de Janeiro and later became the Paço dos Vice-Reis of the State of Brazil (from 1763 to 1808).

== Historical legacy and historiographical interpretation ==
The State of Brazil occupies a central position in historiography concerning the political, administrative, and territorial formation of Brazil. More than a simple colonial structure, the entity is interpreted as the principal instrument for consolidating Portuguese royal power in America, responsible for articulating administrative centralization, negotiation with local elites, and adaptation to the specific conditions of the overseas space.

Contemporary historiography has emphasized the negotiated character of governability in the State of Brazil, moving away from interpretations that conceived it as a mere unilateral imposition by the metropolis. Studies inspired by the political and institutional history of the Ancien Régime highlight the coexistence of multiple centers of power — governors, municipal councils, religious orders, donatários, and economic agents — whose interactions shaped Portuguese administrative practice in America.

On the territorial level, the State of Brazil played a decisive role in the construction of the spatial unity that would later characterize independent Brazil. Despite internal administrative divisions and the existence of autonomous units such as the State of Maranhão, the maintenance of a centralized authority contributed to the progressive integration of the captaincies and the consolidation of a relatively cohesive political space.

=== The concept of colony and Portuguese administrative language ===
Recent historiography has problematized the use of the term "colony" to designate the State of Brazil, emphasizing its anachronistic character when applied to documentation and administrative practice of the Portuguese Empire during the Ancien Régime. In normative and administrative documents of the Crown, Brazil was predominantly designated as a "state", "conquest", "domain", or "part of the kingdoms", and not as a colony in the modern juridical-administrative sense.

The word "colony" appears sporadically and non-systematically in Portuguese sources from the sixteenth to the eighteenth centuries, generally with a generic, economic, or rhetorical meaning, without constituting a formal juridical category. Portuguese administration instead operated according to a logic of unequal integration of overseas territories into the Crown, based on differentiated statutes, local privileges, and institutional arrangements characteristic of the Ancien Régime.

According to António Manuel Hespanha, the modern notion of colony, associated with a rigid hierarchical relationship between metropolis and subordinate territory, is the result of later theoretical formulations, especially from the nineteenth century. Its retrospective application to the State of Brazil tends to obscure the complexity of the Portuguese imperial system, in which overseas domains were not conceived as juridically homogeneous entities nor as strictly subordinated in administrative terms.

Fernando Novais, in turn, emphasizes that the colonial condition of Brazil should be understood primarily on the economic level, through the functioning of the metropolitan exclusive and the subordinate insertion of the territory into the Atlantic system. Such a condition did not automatically translate into a juridical-administrative category called "colony" but functioned as a structural relationship within the Old Colonial System.

=== The State of Brazil in the transition of the colonial system ===
From a juridical-institutional point of view, the persistence of the official designation "State of Brazil" for more than two centuries, even in the face of the expansion of the powers of its governors and the recurrent use of the title of viceroy, demonstrates the flexibility of the Portuguese administrative model and the absence of abrupt formal ruptures within the Ancien Régime.

The elevation of Brazil to the category of kingdom in 1815 is interpreted by historiography as the juridical formalization of gradual transformations that had been underway since at least the transfer of the Portuguese court in 1808. In this sense, the extinction of the State of Brazil marked the end of an administrative model of seventeenth-century origin and opened the way for new forms of political organization that would culminate in the Independence of Brazil and the constitution of a sovereign national state.

=== Composition ===
The State of Brazil originally included 12 of the original 15 captaincies, all except Ceará (which became subordinate to Pernambuco later) and Maranhão, two parts, which included the subcaptaincy of Para west of the Tordesillas Line at that time (north to south):

- Captaincy of Rio Grande de Norte
- Captaincy of Paraíba (southern Rio Grande & Itamaraca)
- Captaincy of Pernambuco
- Captaincy of Bahia
- Captaincy of Ilhéus (became a comarca of Bahia in 1761)
- Captaincy of Porto Seguro
- Captaincy of Espírito Santo
- Captaincy of Rio de Janeiro (São Tomé and São Vicente first section)
- Captaincy of Santo Amaro
- Captaincy of São Vicente (second section, later renamed Captaincy of São Paulo e Minas de Ouro)
- Captaincy of Santana

=== Captaincies created by the state ===
- Captaincy of Alagoas 1817 from Pernambuco
- Captaincy of Ceará 1799 re-split from Pernambuco (previously existed as one of 15 original donatary captaincies)
- Captaincy of Goiás
- Captaincy of Mato Grosso
- Captaincy of Minas Gerais
- Captaincy of São Paulo
- Captaincy of Sergipe 1820 from Bahia
- Captaincy of Rio Grande do Sul (from region of Rio Grande de Sao Pedro)
- Captaincy of Santa Catarina

== See also ==
- List of governors-general of Brazil

== Bibliography ==
- Araújo, Hugo André Flores Fernandes (2018). A construção da governabilidade no Estado do Brasil: perfil social, dinâmicas políticas e redes governativas do governo-geral (1642–1682) (PhD thesis). Rio de Janeiro: Universidade Federal do Rio de Janeiro, Instituto de História, Programa de Pós-Graduação em História Social.
- Bicalho, Maria Fernanda (2003). A cidade e o império: o Rio de Janeiro no século XVIII. Rio de Janeiro: Civilização Brasileira.
- Boxer, C. R. (1973). Salvador de Sá e a luta pelo Brasil e Angola, 1602–1686. São Paulo: Companhia Editora Nacional / Editora da Universidade de São Paulo.
- Coaracy, Vivaldo (1955). Memória da cidade do Rio de Janeiro. Rio de Janeiro: Livraria José Olympio Editora.
- Dias, Maria Odila Leite da Silva (2005). A interiorização da metrópole e outros estudos. São Paulo: Alameda Casa Editorial.
- dos Santos, Fabiano Vilaça (2008). O governo das conquistas do norte: trajetórias administrativas no Estado do Grão-Pará e Maranhão (1751–1780) (PhD thesis). São Paulo: Universidade de São Paulo.
- Fausto, Boris (2008). História do Brasil (13th ed.). São Paulo: EdUSP.
- Fragoso, João; Gouvêa, Maria de Fátima (2014). O Brasil colonial, 1720–1821. Rio de Janeiro: Civilização Brasileira.
- Hespanha, António Manuel (1994). As vésperas do Leviathan: instituições e poder político, Portugal, séc. XVII. Coimbra: Almedina.
- Hespanha, António Manuel (2002). Cultura jurídica europea: síntesis de un milenio (in Spanish). Madrid: Tecnos.
- Marcelino, Maria da Graça dos Santos (2009). O esclarecido vice-reinado de D. Luís de Almeida Portugal, 2.º Marquês do Lavradio: Rio de Janeiro, 1769–1779 (Master's thesis). Lisbon: Universidade de Lisboa, Faculdade de Letras.
- Monteiro, Nuno Gonçalo (2001). Fragoso, João; Bicalho, Maria Fernanda; Gouvêa, Maria de Fátima (eds.). Trajetórias sociais e governo das conquistas: notas preliminares sobre os vice-reis e governadores-gerais do Brasil e da Índia nos séculos XVII e XVIII. Rio de Janeiro: Civilização Brasileira. pp. 249–283.
- Novais, Fernando A. (1979). Portugal e Brasil na crise do Antigo Sistema Colonial (1777–1808). São Paulo: Hucitec.
- Pimenta, João Paulo (2022). Independência do Brasil. São Paulo: Contexto.
- Prado Júnior, Caio (1942). Formação do Brasil contemporâneo: colônia. São Paulo: Brasiliense.
- Reis, Arthur Cézar Ferreira (1966). A Amazônia e a integridade do Brasil. Manaus: Governo do Estado do Amazonas.
- Russell-Wood, A. J. R. (1992). A World on the Move: The Portuguese in Africa, Asia, and America, 1415–1808. Manchester: Carcanet in association with the Calouste Gulbenkian Foundation.
- Salgado, Graça (1985). Fiscais e meirinhos: a administração no Brasil colonial. Rio de Janeiro: Nova Fronteira.
- Schwartz, Stuart B. (1973). Sovereignty and Society in Colonial Brazil: The High Court of Bahia and Its Judges, 1609–1751. Berkeley: University of California Press.
- Schwartz, Stuart B. (1985). Sugar Plantations in the Formation of Brazilian Society: Bahia, 1550–1835. Cambridge: Cambridge University Press.
- Silva, Rogério Forastieri da (1997). Colônia e nativismo: a história como "biografia da nação". São Paulo: Hucitec.
