= State of Grão-Pará and Rio Negro =

Portuguese Empire state in Brazil (1772–75)

State of Grão-Pará and Rio Negro Estado do Grão-Pará e Rio Negro
- 1772–1775
- Flag Coat of arms

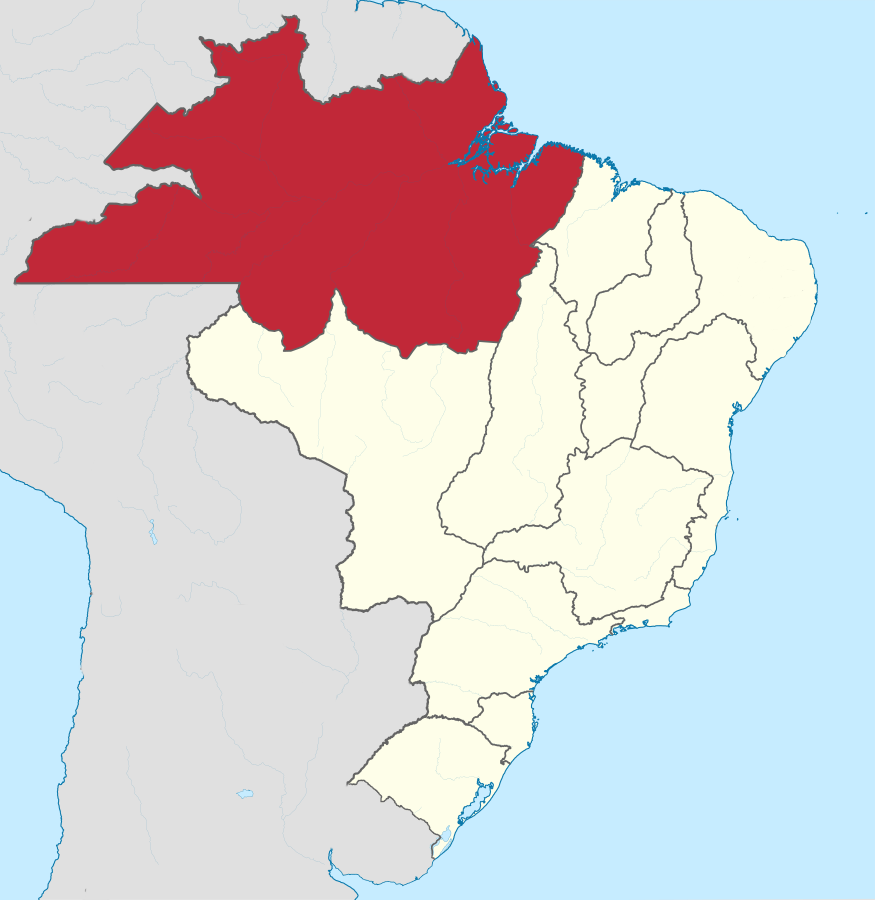
- Map of the State of Grão-Pará and Rio Negro in 1772
- Status: State of the Portuguese Empire
- Capital: Santa Maria de Belém
- Common languages: Portuguese
- Religion: Roman Catholicism
- Monarch
  - 1772–1775: Joseph I
- Governor General
  - 1772–1775: João Pereira Caldas
- History
  - Established: 1772
  - Disestablished: 1775
- Currency: Portuguese Real
Preceded by	Succeeded by
State of Grão-Pará and Maranhão	State of Brazil

The State of Grão-Pará and Rio Negro (Portuguese: Estado do Grão-Pará e Rio Negro) was one of the states of the Portuguese Empire.

== History ==
The state was created in 1772 by order of Sebastião José de Carvalho e Melo, 1st Marquis of Pombal, the Secretary of the State for Joseph I of Portugal.

The state was created because of the economic success of the State of Grão-Pará and Maranhão. Sebastião José de Carvalho e Melo split that state into two states, the State of Grão-Pará and Rio Negro and the State of Maranhão and Piauí, thinking that this would cause even better economic conditions, though the state split would prove a failure.

In 1775, due to economical issues in Belém and São Luis, both the State of Grão-Pará and Rio Negro and the State of Maranhão and Piauí were merged into the State of Brazil, formally unifying Portuguese America into one colony. However, the State of Grão-Pará and Rio Negro would remain autonomous of the Brazilian colonial government until 1823, when it would formally join the Empire of Brazil
