= State of Maranhão (colonial) =

Administrative division of the Portuguese Empire in northern South America (1621–1751)

State of Maranhão Estado do Maranhão
- 1621–1751
- Flag Coat of arms

- State of Maranhão in 1709
- Status: State of the Portuguese Empire
- Capital: São Luís
- Common languages: Portuguese
- Religion: Roman Catholicism
- Government: Dependent territory under an absolute monarchy
- Monarch
  - 1621: Philip II
  - 1706–1737: John V
- Captain-major
  - 1621–1622: Domingos da Costa Machado
  - 1736–1737: João Alves de Carvalho
- History
  - Established: 1621
  - Disestablished: 1751
- Currency: Portuguese Real
Preceded by	Succeeded by
Governorate General of Brazil	State of Grão-Pará and Maranhão

The State of Maranhão (Portuguese: Estado do Maranhão), called the State of Maranhão and Grão-Pará from 1654 onwards, was the northern of two seventeenth–eighteenth century administrative divisions of the colonial Portuguese Empire in South America.

== History ==
In 1621 the Governorate General of Brazil was separated into two states; the State of Brazil and the State of Maranhão. The state was created on 13 June 1621 by Philip II of Portugal.

With the creation of the state Portuguese America had two administrative units: the State of Maranhão with its capital in São Luís, and the State of Brazil whose capital was São Salvador. After the 1670s Belém became the operational base of the Maranhão governors and it was formally designated the state capital in 1737.

The purpose of creating this state was to improve military defense in the Northern Region and stimulate economic activities and regional trade with the mainland. The state encompassed a large part of the Amazon rainforest. Its economy depended on the extraction of products from the forest, the so-called drogas do sertão, for which the colonists heavily employed indigenous slave labour.

Although the administrative system officially followed a hierarchy between the governor and his intendants on the higher level and the councils of the cities São Luís and Belém responsible for local affairs, in practice this distinction between their mandates was not very clear. Since the Catholic orders also held substantial influence, especially the Jesuits, this led to conflict.

The State of Maranhão was extinguished in 1652 and in 1654 reconstituted as Maranhão and Grão-Pará. In 1751 the State of Maranhão and Grão-Pará had its name changed to Grão-Pará and Maranhão and its capital was moved from São Luís to Belém.

== Composition ==
The following captaincies formed the State of Maranhão. Ceará was later detached and became a satellite of Pernambuco, in the State of Brazil.

=== Royal captaincies ===
- Captaincy of Maranhão
- Captaincy of Pará
- Captaincy of Ceará (later became subordinate to Pernambuco)

=== Donatary captaincies created ===
- Captaincy of Tapuitapera
- Captaincy of Caeté
- Captaincy of Cametá
- Captaincy of Cabo Norte (Amapá)
- Captaincy of Marajó
- Captaincy of Xingu
