= State of Grão-Pará and Maranhão =

One of the Brazilian states of the Portuguese Empire

State of Grão-Pará and Maranhão Estado do Grão-Pará e Maranhão
- 1751–1772
- Flag Coat of arms

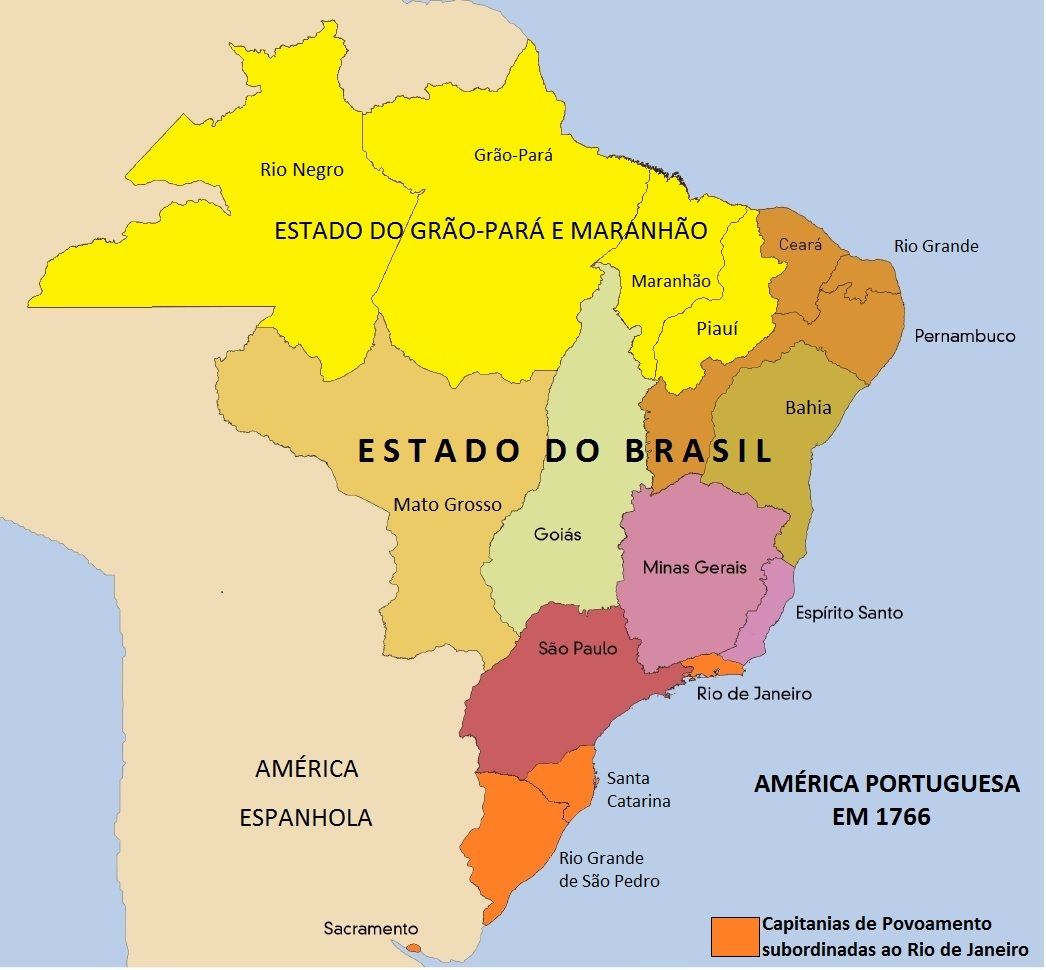
- State of Grão-Pará and Maranhão displayed in yellow
- Status: State of the Portuguese Empire
- Capital: Santa Maria de Belém
- Common languages: Portuguese
- Religion: Roman Catholicism
- Government: Dependent territory under an absolute monarchy
- Monarch
  - 1751–1772: John V Joseph I
- Governor General
  - 1751–1759: Francisco Xavier de Mendonça Furtado
  - 1763–1772: Fernando da Costa de Ataíde Teive
- History
  - Established: 1751
  - Disestablished: 1772
- Currency: Portuguese Real
Preceded by	Succeeded by
State of Maranhão (colonial)	State of Grão-Pará and Rio Negro; State of Maranhão and Piauí

The State of Grão-Pará and Maranhão (Portuguese: Estado do Grão-Pará e Maranhão) was one of the states of the Portuguese Empire.

== History ==
The state was created on 31 July 1751 by order of Sebastião José de Carvalho e Melo, 1st Marquis of Pombal, the Secretary of the State for Joseph I of Portugal.

The state was the successor to the State of Maranhão. While there were limited territorial changes, Maranhão was politically and economically restructured and its capital was moved from São Luís, in the Captaincy of Maranhão, to Santa Maria de Belém, in the Captaincy of Pará, which was raised to a unified state with Maranhão and had its name changed to Grão-Pará (English: Great wide river).

The purpose of creating this state was to stimulate economic activities.

In 1772, the state was split into two different states, the State of Grão-Pará and Rio Negro and the State of Maranhão and Piauí.

== Composition ==
The State of Grão-Pará and Maranhão, for the most part, retained all the same captaincies from the State of Maranhão:

- Captaincy of Maranhão
- Captaincy of Pará
- Captaincy of Piauí
- Captaincy of Ceará
- Captaincy of Tapuitapera
- Captaincy of Caeté
- Captaincy of Cametá
- Captaincy of Cabo Norte
- Captaincy of Marajó
- Captaincy of Xingu
