= State of Maranhão and Piauí =

State of the Portuguese Empire

State of Maranhão and Piauí Estado do Maranhão e Piauí
- 1772–1775
- Flag Coat of arms
- Status: State of the Portuguese Empire
- Capital: São Luís
- Common languages: Portuguese
- Religion: Roman Catholicism
- Government: Dependent territory under an absolute monarchy
- Monarch
  - 1772–1775: Joseph I
- Governor General
  - 1772–1775: Joaquim de Mello e Póvoas
- History
  - Established: 1772
  - Disestablished: 1775
- Currency: Portuguese Real
Preceded by	Succeeded by
State of Grão-Pará and Maranhão	State of Brazil

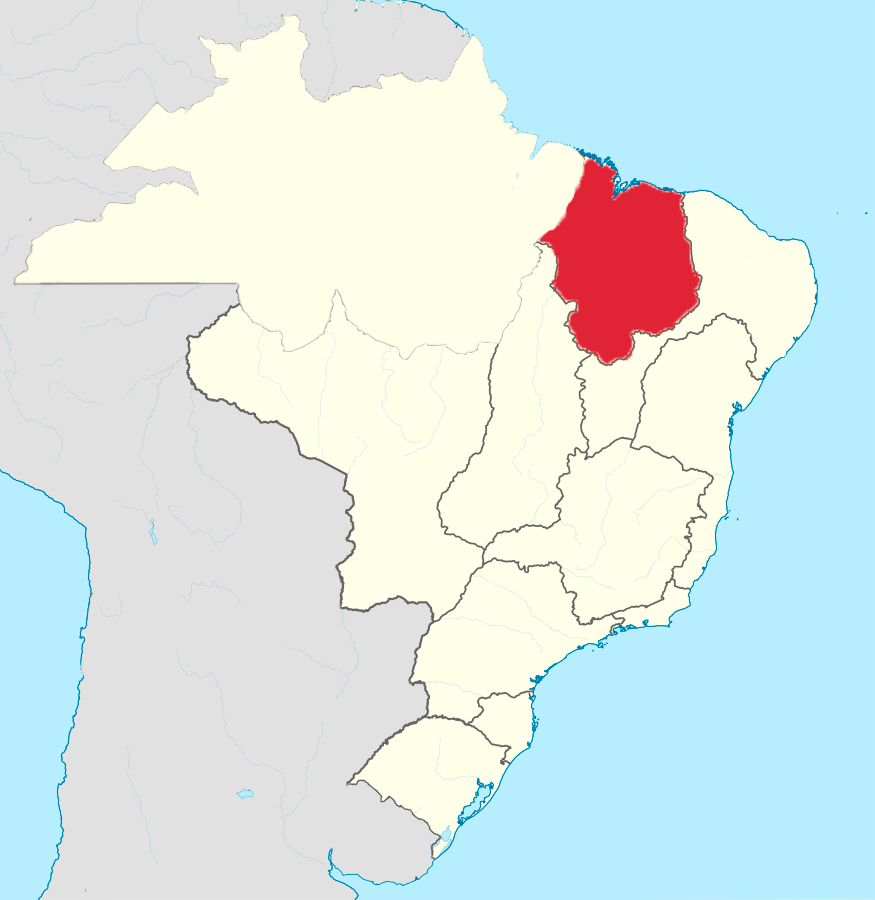
Location of the State of Maranhão and Piauí

The State of Maranhão and Piauí (Portuguese: Estado do Maranhão e Piauí) was one of the states of the Portuguese Empire.

== History ==
The state was created in 1772 by order of Sebastião José de Carvalho e Melo, 1st Marquis of Pombal, the Secretary of the State for Joseph I of Portugal.

The state was created because of the economic success of the State of Grão-Pará and Maranhão. Sebastião José de Carvalho e Melo split that state into two states, the State of Grão-Pará and Rio Negro and the State of Maranhão and Piauí, thinking that this would cause even better economic conditions, though the state split would prove a failure.

In 1775, due to the failure of the new state, both the State of Grão-Pará and Rio Negro and the State of Maranhão and Piauí were merged into the State of Brazil, finally unifying Portuguese America into one colony.
