= Ataíde =

Ataíde is a Portuguese surname. Notable people with the surname include:

- António de Ataíde (c.1500–1563), Portuguese nobleman and diplomat
- Elton Junior Melo Ataíde (born 1990), Brazilian footballer
- João Manuel de Ataíde (1570–1633), Portuguese bishop
- Luís de Ataíde, 3rd Count of Atouguia (1516 - 1581), viceroy of Portuguese India
- Manoel da Costa Ataíde (1762–1830), Brazilian painter and sculptor
- Martinho de Ataíde, 2nd Count of Atouguia (c. 1415 - 1499), Portuguese nobleman
- Pedro Manuel de Ataíde (1665–1722), Portuguese nobleman
- Pero de Ataíde (c.1450–1504), Portuguese naval captain and explorer
- Vasco de Ataíde (died c.1500), Portuguese naval captain and explorer
- Leonardo Ataíde (born 2004), Brazilian footballer
