= Ataíde family =

Noble family of the Kingdom of Portugal

House of Ataíde Família Ataíde
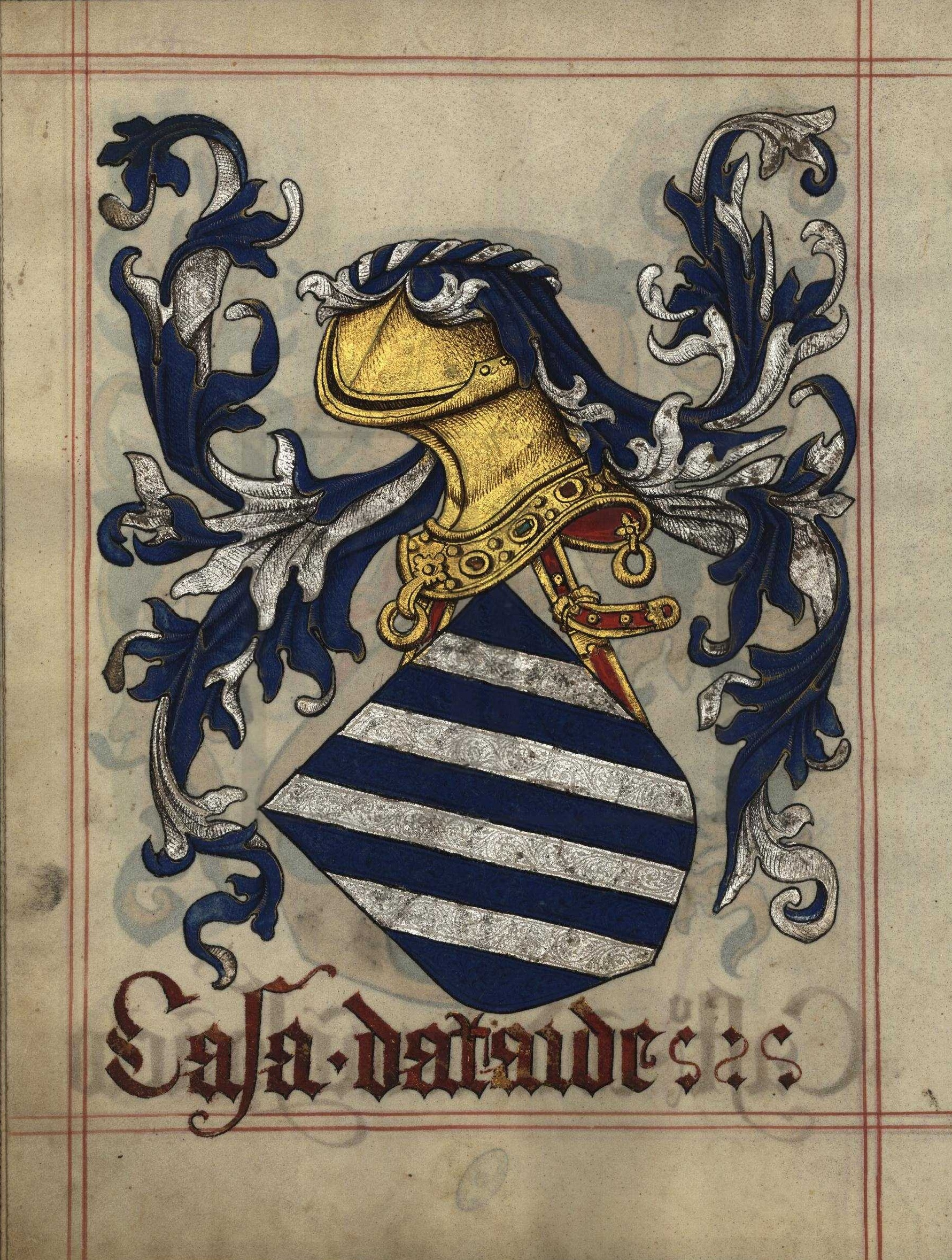
- Coat of Arms of the House of Ataíde, in Livro do Armeiro-Mor (1509)
- Country: Kingdom of Portugal; Portuguese Empire; Brazil
- Earlier spellings: Ataide, Taide, Atayde, Athayde
- Origin: Honra de Ataíde, Portugal
- Founded: 12th century
- Founder: D. Egas Duer (c. 1140 - c. 1180)
- Titles: Marquess; Count; Lord; Viceroy; Prior of Crato; Cardinal; Bishop

Ataíde is the name of a noble family from the Kingdom of Portugal, many of whose members played important roles in the course of the Portuguese overseas exploration and expansion and in the internal and foreign policies of Portugal and its empire.

== History ==
=== Origin ===
The origin of the Ataíde family can be documented since the 12th century, its progenitor being D. Egas Duer (c. 1140 – c. 1180), a fidalgo of the County of Portugal (and likely a member of the early medieval House of Riba Douro), who was the 1st Lord of the Honra of Ataíde («propter honorem Domne Egee Duer»), located in what was then the county of Santa Cruz de Riba Tâmega (near present-day Amarante), in the northern Portuguese region of Entre Douro e Minho.

Egas Duer's son, Martim Viegas, was the first to use the surname Ataíde, derived from the name of the Honra of which he was Lord.

Martim Viegas' grandson, Gonçalo Viegas de Ataíde, had the lordship of the honra de Ataíde confirmed by King Dinis I, in the year 1288.

=== 14th to 15th century ===
Gonçalo Viegas' great-grandson, Martim Gonçalves de Ataíde, Castellan of the castle of Chaves, sided with Castile in the Portuguese interregnum crisis of 1383-1385. For this reason, he had to go into exile in Castile and his wife and children only returned to Portugal after his death, in 1392.

Two of the sons of Martim Gonçalves stood out in the history of Portugal of the period. Vasco Fernandes de Ataíde, governor of the house of Prince Henry the Navigator, died in the conquest of Ceuta in 1415, thus being the first Portuguese nobleman to fall in combat at the start of the period of Portuguese maritime exploration. And the eldest son, Dom Álvaro Gonçalves de Ataíde, was created 1st count of Atouguia, by royal decree of King Afonso V, in December 1448.

=== Counts of Atouguia and of Castanheira ===
The main branches of the Ataide family originate from the 1st Count of Atouguia, including his ten successors as holders of that title and the Counts of Castanheira (created 1532) and Castro Daire (created 1625). The honra of Ataíde, the family's original manor house, would be inherited by a branch of descent through the female line of the 1st Count of Atouguia, who were also lords of the honra of Barbosa, near Penafiel (founded in the 12th century, confirmed by royal decree in 1543).

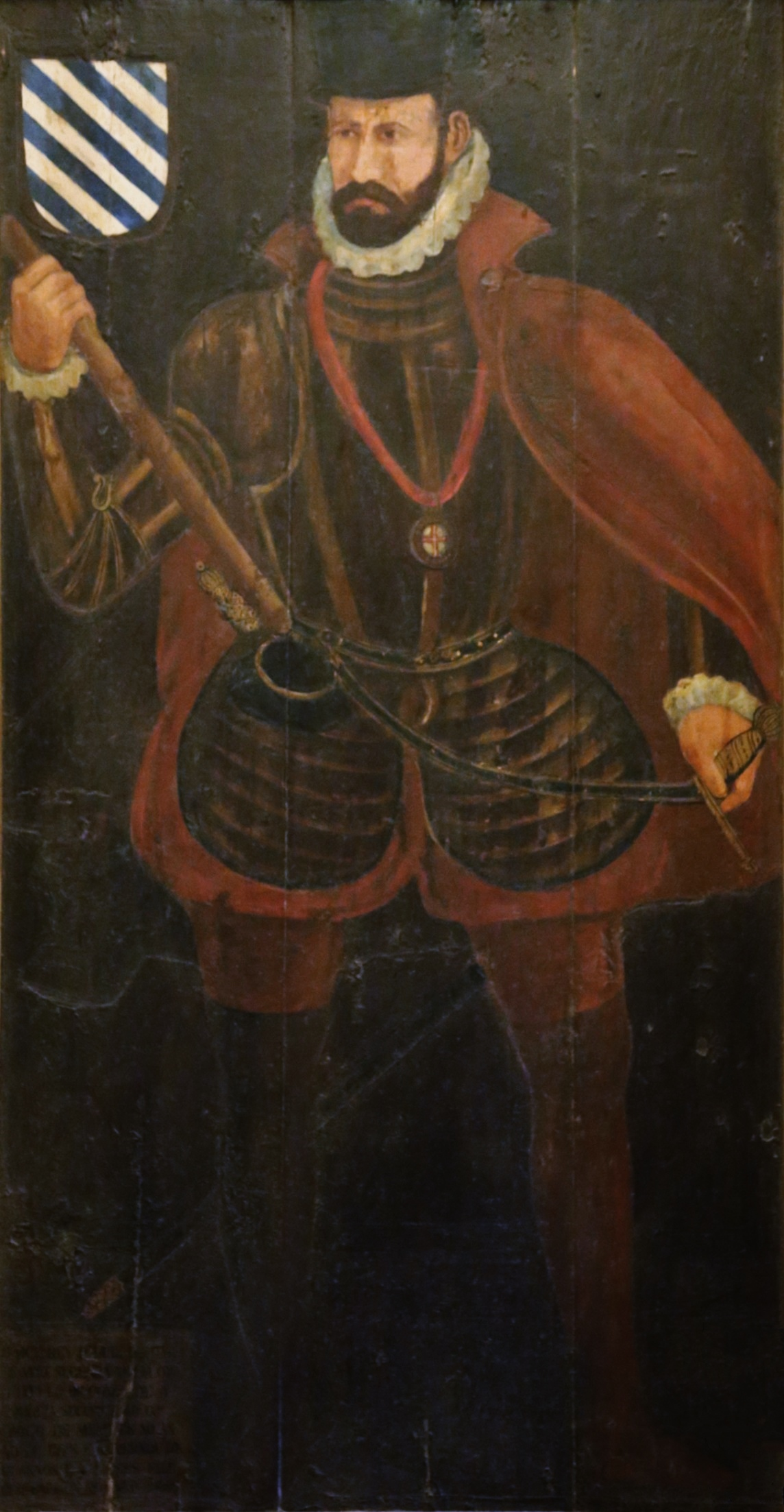
Dom Luís de Ataíde (1516-1581), viceroy at Goa, who successfully defended the Portuguese possessions in Asia, in the War of the League of the Indies

In the year 1485, D. Álvaro de Ataíde, second-born son of the 1st Count of Atouguia, was involved in the Duke of Viseu's conspiracy against King João II, and he and his eldest son were sentenced to death for the crimes of treason and lèse majesté. His son, D. Pedro, was executed in Setúbal, but Dom Álvaro managed to escape to the kingdom of Castile, and years later he was authorized to return to Portugal by King Manuel I, who protected him.

However, the eldest son of the 1st Count of Atouguia, Dom Martinho de Ataíde, was the successor to the title and did not participate in this conspiracy, being a loyal servant of the monarchs Afonso V and João II. Dom Martinho, probably at the behest of Prince Henry the Navigator, also received from the Castilian sovereign Henry IV the lordship of the Canary Islands, whose effective rule would in the end evade the control of the Portuguese crown.

Two other sons of the 1st count of Atouguia, D. João and D. Vasco, held successively, for several decades, the important position of Prior of Crato, that is, of head of the Order of the Knights Hospitalier in Portugal.

=== Participants in the Portuguese maritime expansion ===
Among the grandchildren of the 1st Count of Atouguia, the famous governor of Portuguese India, Afonso de Albuquerque, stood out. Another grandson who played an important role in the political history of Portugal and its colony of Brazil in the first half of the 16th century was D. António de Ataíde, the 1st Count of Castanheira, a childhood friend and protégé of King João III. Two other of the 1st Count of Atouguia's grandchildren, but in an illegitimate line of descent, were the navigators Vasco de Ataíde and Pêro de Ataíde, captains in the 2nd India armada in which Pedro Álvares Cabral discovered Brazil. Pêro's grandson and namesake was the 8th captain-major of Portuguese Ceylon, from 1564 to 1565.

Also at the beginning of the 16th century, a descendant of another branch of the Ataíde family, Nuno Fernandes de Ataíde, was a notable military commander in Morocco. He daringly led an attack on the city of Marrakesh in 1515, an action that historian A. R. Disney considers to have been “the high point of Portuguese expansion" in Morocco. And Nuno Fernandes' sister, Dona Catarina de Ataíde, was the wife of the explorer Vasco da Gama.

D. Luís de Ataíde, 3rd Count of Atouguia, stood out as viceroy of Portuguese India in the second half of the 16th century, having in his first term (1569 – 1572) successfully defended the Portuguese possessions in Asia from a coordinated attack by several Indian potentates, in the War of the League of the Indies. This conflict was a practical instance of a total war, whose concept would only be formulated by scholars two centuries later, in opposition to the notion of limited war. Due to his military experience, King Sebastian I initially appointed Ataíde to command the expedition to Morocco that would result in the Portuguese defeat at Alcácer Quibir, but in the end it was the king himself who decided to lead it. The new monarch Philip II granted D. Luís the title of marquess of Santarém, with a view to guaranteeing his support, as viceroy in Goa, for the proclamation of the Spanish Habsburg ruler of Portugal as sovereign in the Portuguese empire in Asia.

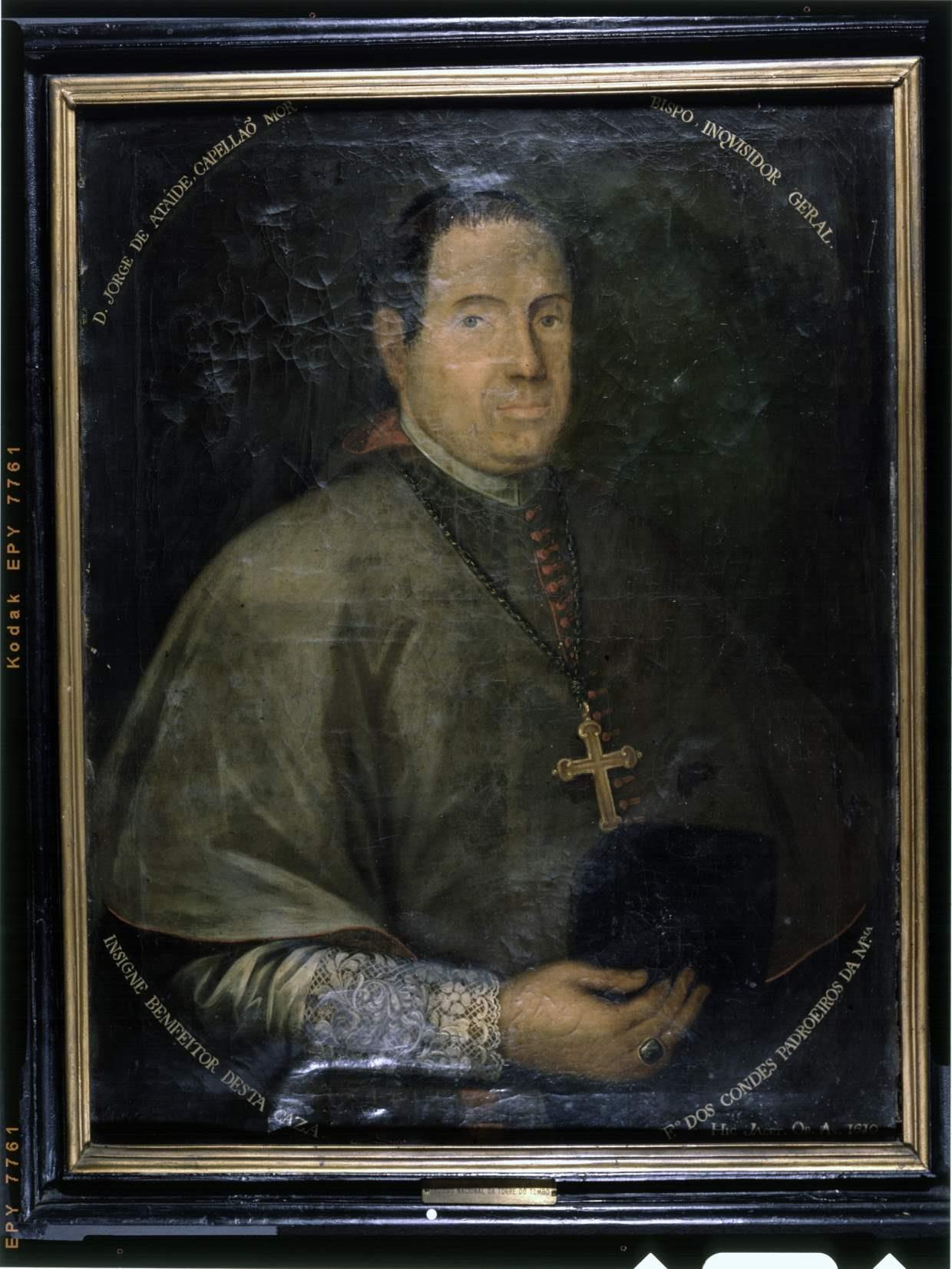
D. Jorge de Ataíde (1535-1611), bishop of Viseu and prominent member of the Council of Portugal, the ruling body of the Portuguese Empire during the Iberian Union. He was a younger son of the 1st Count of Castanheira

=== 1640 and after ===
In the 17th century, the 6th Count of Atouguia, Jerónimo de Ataíde and his mother Dona Filipa de Vilhena, Marchioness of Atouguia, were prominent participants in the 1640 revolution, which overthrew the rule of the Spanish Habsburgs and placed the Bragança dynasty on the Portuguese throne. The 6th count would later be nominated governor of colonial Brazil.

In the Portuguese war of independence that followed the 1640 revolution, Dom Francisco de Azevedo e Ataíde, lord of the honras of Barbosa and Ataíde, was an important military commander, as was his uncle D. João de Ataíde, who also wrote a notable Treatise on cavalry. An Abbess born in the 17th century at this same honra de Barbosa, Dona Bárbara Micaela de Ataíde, ordered the construction of the Santa Clara Aqueduct in Vila do Conde.

The counts of Pontével (created 1665), Povolide (created 1709) and Sintra (created 1823) were descendants of a sister of the viceroy Dom Luís de Ataíde and they inherited several of his estates. Cardinal Dom Nuno da Cunha e Ataíde, a brother of the 1st count of Povolide, was a prominent advisor to King John V.

Other descendants of the counts of Atouguia and Castanheira through a female line, such as the Counts of Atalaia and the Marquesses of Lavradio also sometimes used Ataíde as one of their surnames - as did Manuel de Carvalho e Ataíde, the father of the 1st Marquis of Pombal.

The title of Count of Atouguia was extinguished in 1759, following the participation of the 11th Count, Dom Jerónimo de Ataíde in the Távora conspiracy against king Joseph I. He was sentenced to death and all his property confiscated, but the genealogical representation of the title remained with the counts of Ribeira Grande.

The titles, estates and properties of the Castanheira/Castro Daire line (of which two members, Bishop D. Jorge de Ataíde and his nephew António de Ataíde, 1st Count of Castro Daire and viceroy of Portugal, were renowned politicians of the Iberian Union) would end up passing, through the marriage of the heiress of these titles, after the end of the 17th century, to the counts of Vidigueira and marquesses of Nisa, that is, the family of the descendants and heirs of Vasco da Gama. As for the properties included in the former honra of Ataíde, the ancient manor house where the family originated, they would remain in the possession of the lords of Barbosa until the extinction of the morgadios (the Portuguese equivalent of majorats, or Fee tails) in Portugal, in 1863.

== In literature ==
- The French writer Antoine de La Sale, in his 1458 work Reconfort a Madame de Neufville, narrates the stoic resignation of Vasco Fernandes de Ataíde's mother, faced with her son's death in the Portuguese Conquest of Ceuta.
- The involvement of D. Álvaro de Ataíde, lord of Castanheira, in the conspiracy of the Duke of Viseu against King John II was the subject of a comedy in Spanish by Tirso de Molina, published in the year 1611, entitled La gallega Mari-Hernández, in which the two main characters are the King of Portugal and the conspirator Dom Álvaro.
- Luís de Camões wrote two sonnets dedicated to viceroy D. Luís de Ataíde, in which he praises his political and military achievements in Portuguese India.
- The French navigator and explorer François Pyrard de Laval, in his 1679 book Voyage de Francois Pyrard, de Laval, contenant sa navigation aux Indes Orientales, Maldives, Moluques, & au Brésil, described his contemporary Dom Estêvão de Ataíde, defender of Mozambique against the Dutch attacks and sieges of 1607 and 1608, as "a courageous and gallant Lord".
- The play Filipa de Vilhena by Almeida Garrett tells the story of the involvement of D. Jerónimo de Ataíde - encouraged by his mother, the Countess and later Marchioness of Atouguia, Filipa de Vilhena - in the 1640 revolution in Lisbon, which overthrew the rule of the Spanish Habsburgs in Portugal.
- In The Illustrious House of Ramires, the final novel written by Eça de Queiroz, the central character Gonçalo Mendes Ramires mentions the role of the Ataíde family in the history of Portugal, an "august land, trodden by such heroes as [the] da Gama, Ataíde, Castro and his own ancestors".
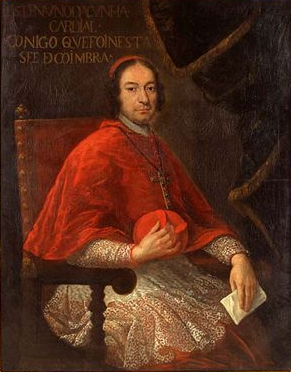
  Cardinal D. Nuno da Cunha e Ataíde (1664-1750), a brother of the 1st Count of Povolide.He was an influential adviser of king John V

== Genealogical summary (1385 – 1581) ==
D. Álvaro Gonçalves de Ataíde (c. 1385–1452); 1st Count of Atouguia
D. Álvaro de Ataíde (c. 1416–1505); Lord of Castanheira, conspired against King John II, pardoned by King Manuel I	D. Martinho de Ataíde, 2nd Count of Atouguia (1415–1499); Lord of the Canary Islands in 1455	Dona Mécia de Castro de Ataíde (c. 1420–c. 1494) married to the Lord of Gouveia and Barbosa
D. António de Ataíde (1500–1563); 1st Count of Castanheira, founder of the Castanheira and Castro Daire lines	Dom João de Ataíde (1458-c. 1505?) renounced succession	Dona Joana de Castro (1460–1532); Heiress of the Honra de Ataíde in 1494
D. Afonso de Ataíde, 3rd Lord of Atouguia (c.1482-1555)
D. Luís de Ataíde, 3rd Count of Atouguia (1516–1581); Viceroy of Portuguese India	Lords of the honras of Barbosa and Ataíde
