= Jerónimo de Ataíde =

21st governor-general of Brazil (1654–1657)

His Lordship The Count of Atouguia
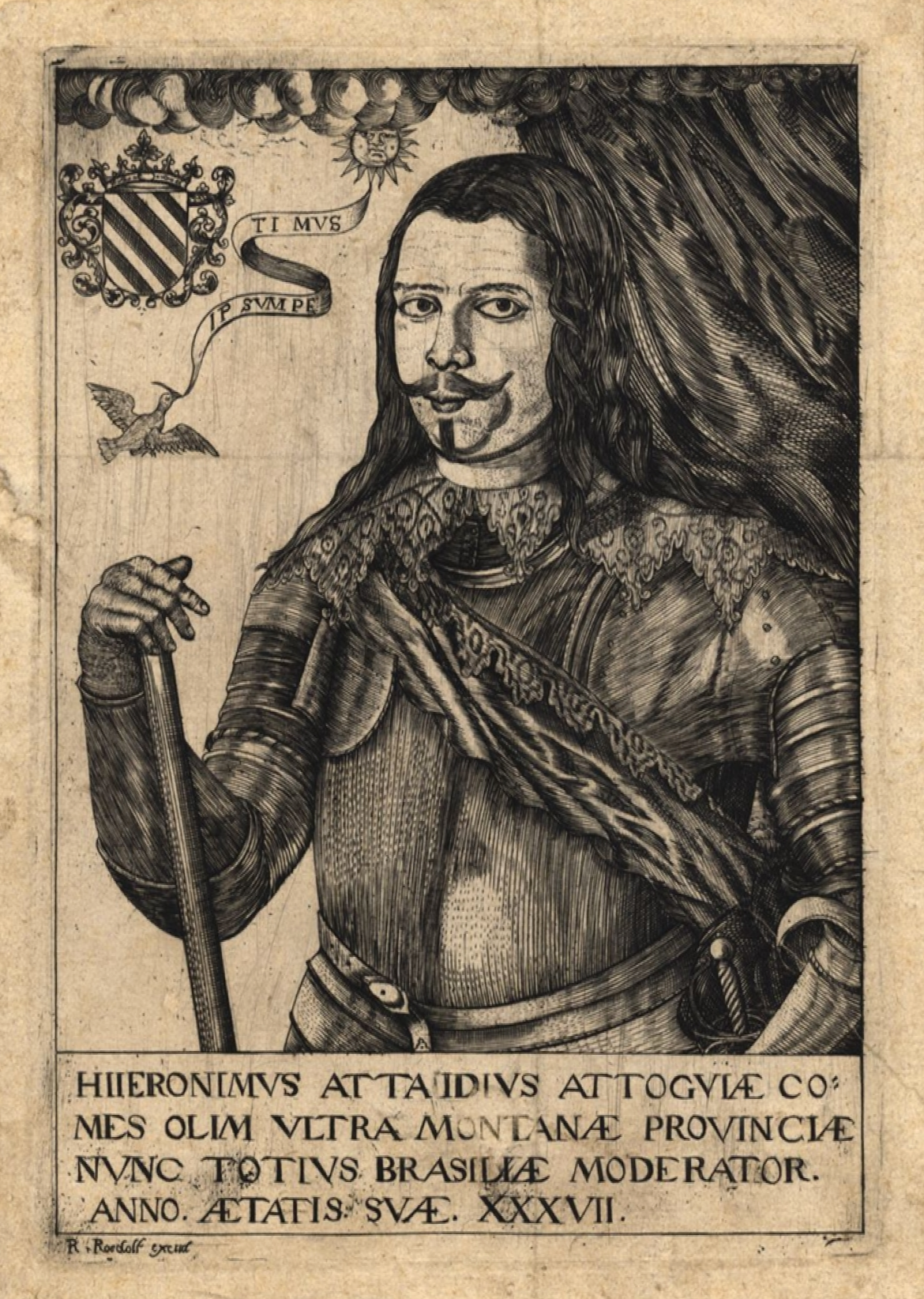

Governor-General of Brazil
- In office 14 December 1654 – 20 June 1657
- Preceded by: Count of Castelo Melhor
- Succeeded by: Francisco Barreto

Personal details
- Born: 1610 Lisbon, Portugal
- Died: 16 August 1665 (aged 54–55)
- Spouse(s): D. Maria de Castro (m. 1658; died 1661) D. Leonor de Meneses (m. 1660) ?

D. Jerónimo de Ataíde, 6th Count of Atouguia (1610 – 16 August 1665) was a Portuguese nobleman and colonial administrator, Governor-General of Brazil from 1654 to 1657.

Firstborn of D. Filipa de Vilhena and D. Luís de Ataíde, 3rd Count of Atouguia, he was one of the two brothers whom his famous mother armed with knights, sending them to fight to defend the independence of the country, becoming one of the brave noble restorers who carried out the coup d'état on 1 December 1640, and it is even said that he was one of those who entered Ribeira Palace, who went to the room of the traitor Miguel de Vasconcelos to kill him.

He was commander of Adaúfe and Vila Velha de Ródão, in the Order of Christ.

== Positions held ==
He was the nobleman of the Royal House; he would be governor of Peniche in 1640, governor of arms of the provinces of Trás-os-Montes in 1649 and 1652, governor and captain-general of the State of Brazil (appointed by charter of 21 February 1653, took office on 14 December 1654), governor of the Arms of Alentejo in 1659, captain general of the Royal Armada on 25 June 1662, president of the Board of Commerce in 1664, war advisor in 1661, and of the council of state in 1662; gentleman from the Chamber of King Afonso VI of Portugal.

While serving as Arms governor of the province of Trás-os-Montes, he repelled a Spanish invasion across the border of Chaves.

== Governor-general of Brazil ==
In the general government of Brazil, he received the embassy of the people of São Paulo who tried to put an end to the war between Pires and Camargos that was disturbing the captaincy of the south, writing the famous ordinance of 24 November 1655 in which he granted general amnesty. It was determined that the votes in the portfolios for the election of aediles were organized by three Pires supporters, as many opponents, and one neutral. These organizers of the tickets would not be "the leaders of the gang, but men among the most zealous and timid." The constitution of the municipal chambers would be such that there would always be a judge and a councilor from each of the fighting parties, a neutral councilor, and the council's attorney. His provision was received with expressions of joy in São Paulo, and the king greatly appreciated his delegate's decision.

It was up to him to celebrate the final victory of arms against the Dutch. He repressed acts of rebellion by the Indians (Nobreza de Portugal, volume II, page 335) and exercised a model administration full of honesty and balance, unfortunately almost limited to the captaincy of Bahia, because, from the death of Mem de Sá, the governors of the other captaincies were arrogating successive prerogatives, only theoretically recognizing the hegemony of the Governor-General. The difficulty of communications and the size of Brazil also contributed to these facts.

He was succeeded in the government of Brazil by Francisco Barreto de Meneses.

== Marriages and descendants ==
He married twice.

His first marriage was in 1658, to his cousin D. Maria de Castro (d. 1661), daughter of Francisco de Sá e Meneses, 2nd Count of Penaguião, and Countess D. Joana de Castro. She gave birth to D. Manuel Luís de Ataíde, 7th Count of Atouguia.

His second marriage was to D. Leonor de Meneses, widow of the 1st Count of Serém, daughter and heiress of D. Fernando de Meneses, commander of Castelo Branco, and D. Jerónima de Toledo (this daughter of D. Manuel da Câmara, 2nd Count of Vila Franca. D. Leonor de Meneses was heiress, among other ties, of the former morgado of Carvalho, which would thus pass to the house of Atouguia, remaining there until the execution of the 11th count in 1759, in the so-called Távoras process. Inventories of the House of Tavora, Atoguia, and Aveiro. After that, Carvalho's estate would pass into the possession of the family of the 1st Marquis of Pombal. The couple had numerous children, including D. Luís Peregrino de Ataíde, who would become the 8th Count of Atouguia, as his brother, the 7th Count, died without issue. Leonor published, under the pseudonym Laura Múrcia, the work El Desdichado mas firma (Lisbon, 1655).

== Personal life ==
Passionate about genealogy, he wrote «Nobiliario das Familias d'este Reyno», four volumes, a manuscript that was preserved in the bookstore of the convent of Graça, in Lisbon.

He is buried in the main chapel of the convent of Santa Maria de Xabregas, patronage of his house.

Preceded by Luís de Ataíde	Count of Atouguia; 1639–1665	Succeeded by Manuel Luís de Ataíde
Preceded by João Rodrigues de Vasconcelos e Sousa	Governor-general of Brazil; 1654–1657	Succeeded by Francisco Barreto de Meneses
