= Siege of Honavar (1571) =

- Part of War of the League of the Indies
Date	July 1571
Location	Honavar, India
Result	Portuguese victory

Belligerents
Portuguese Empire	Kingdom of Garsopa, Sultanate of Bijapur

Commanders and leaders
Dom Luís de Ataíde	Queen of Garsopa, Ali Adil Shah I

Strength
200 men, 1 galley, 8 foists	5,000 men, 400 horse (provided by Queen of Garsopa), 2,000 men (provided by Adil Shah of Bijapur)

Casualties and losses
Unknown	Unknown

== Context ==
In 1569, the Viceroy Luís de Ataíde oversaw the takeover of the coastal town of Honavar, where a small fort was built. In the middle of July 1571.

== The battle ==
During the monsoon, it was attacked by 5000 men and 400 cavalry of the neighbouring Kingdom of Garsopa, instigated by the Adil Shah of Bijapur, who provided 2,000 of those men. The Viceroy Luís de Ataíde dispatched 200 men to reinforce the fort by sea aboard a galley and eight foists,

== Aftermath ==
The small fleet managed to reach the fort despite the monsoon weather and immediately conducted a successful attack on the enemy army and the fort held on.
