= Vasco de Ataíde =

Portuguese sailor

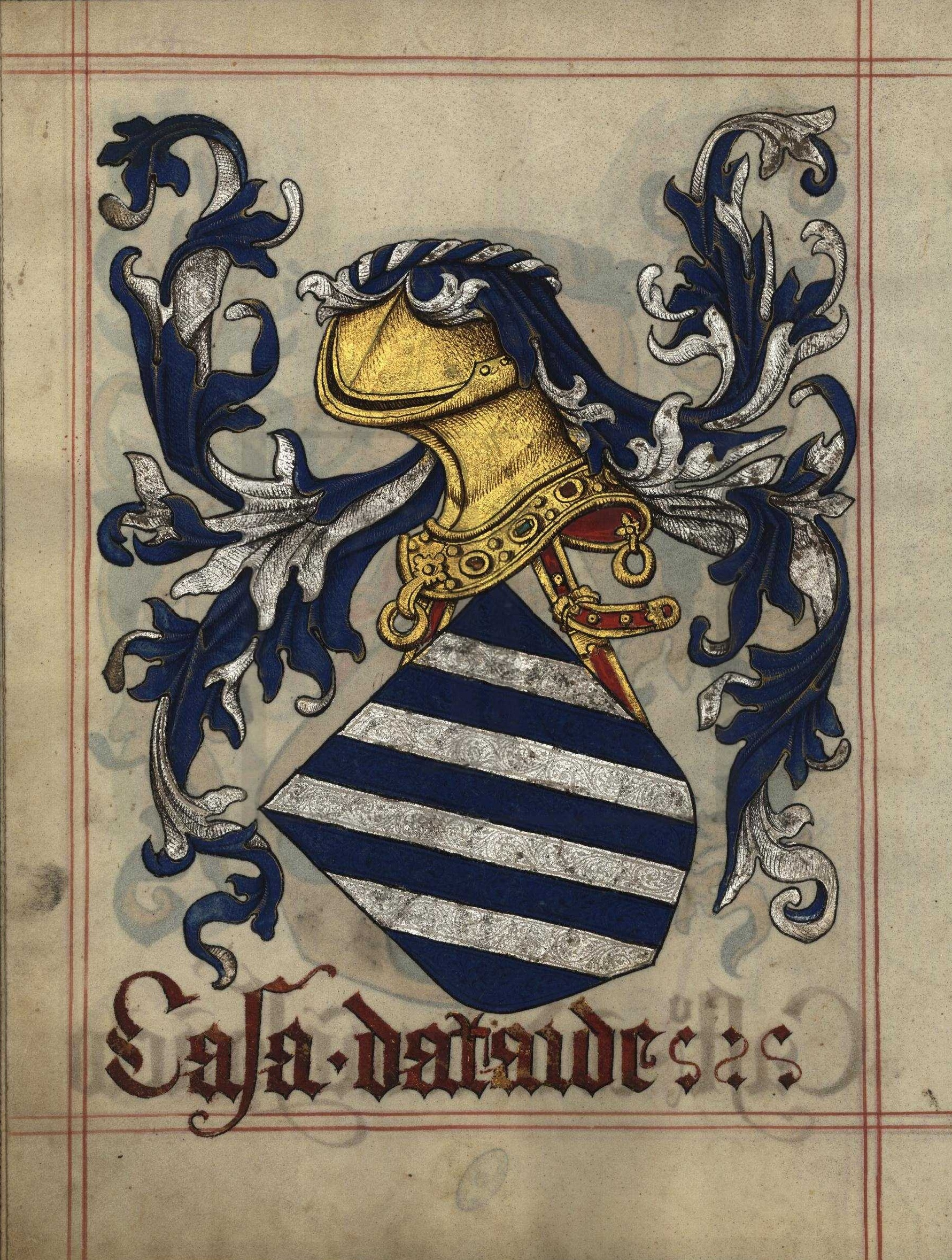
- Coat of Arms of the Ataíde family
- Born: Portuguese Empire
- Died: 1500; Atlantic Ocean
- Occupation: Sailor
- Known for: Mysterious disappearance
- Parents: D. Pedro de Ataíde, Abbot of Penalva (father); ? (mother)
- Family: Ataíde

Vasco de Ataíde (or Taide) was a Portuguese sailor whose ship was a part of Pedro Álvares Cabral's expedition to India in 1500. His ship went missing early in the voyage and so was not present when the fleet accidentally became the first recorded European presence to visit what is now Brazil.

Little is known about Vasco, even less than about his brother Pêro de Ataíde, although contemporary sources record that he was one of four illegitimate children (three sons and one daughter) of D. Pedro de Ataíde, Abbot of Penalva do Castelo, himself an illegitimate son of D. Álvaro Gonçalves de Ataíde, the first Count of Atouguia.

On Tuesday, 24 March 1500, the ship he captained and its crew of one-hundred-and-fifty disappeared after sailing west across the Atlantic Ocean toward Brazil. The ship had departed the day before from the Portuguese settlement at Cape Verde, off the coast of Western Africa.

Pero Vaz de Caminha, chronicler of Cabral's expedition, wrote: "On the night of Monday next, at sunrise, Vasco de Ataíde was lost from the fleet without any strong or contrary winds that could make it happen. The captain did his best to find it, but it appeared no more."

== See also ==
- List of people who disappeared mysteriously at sea
