= António de Ataíde =

Portuguese politician and Count (1500-1563)

- 1st Count of Castanheira
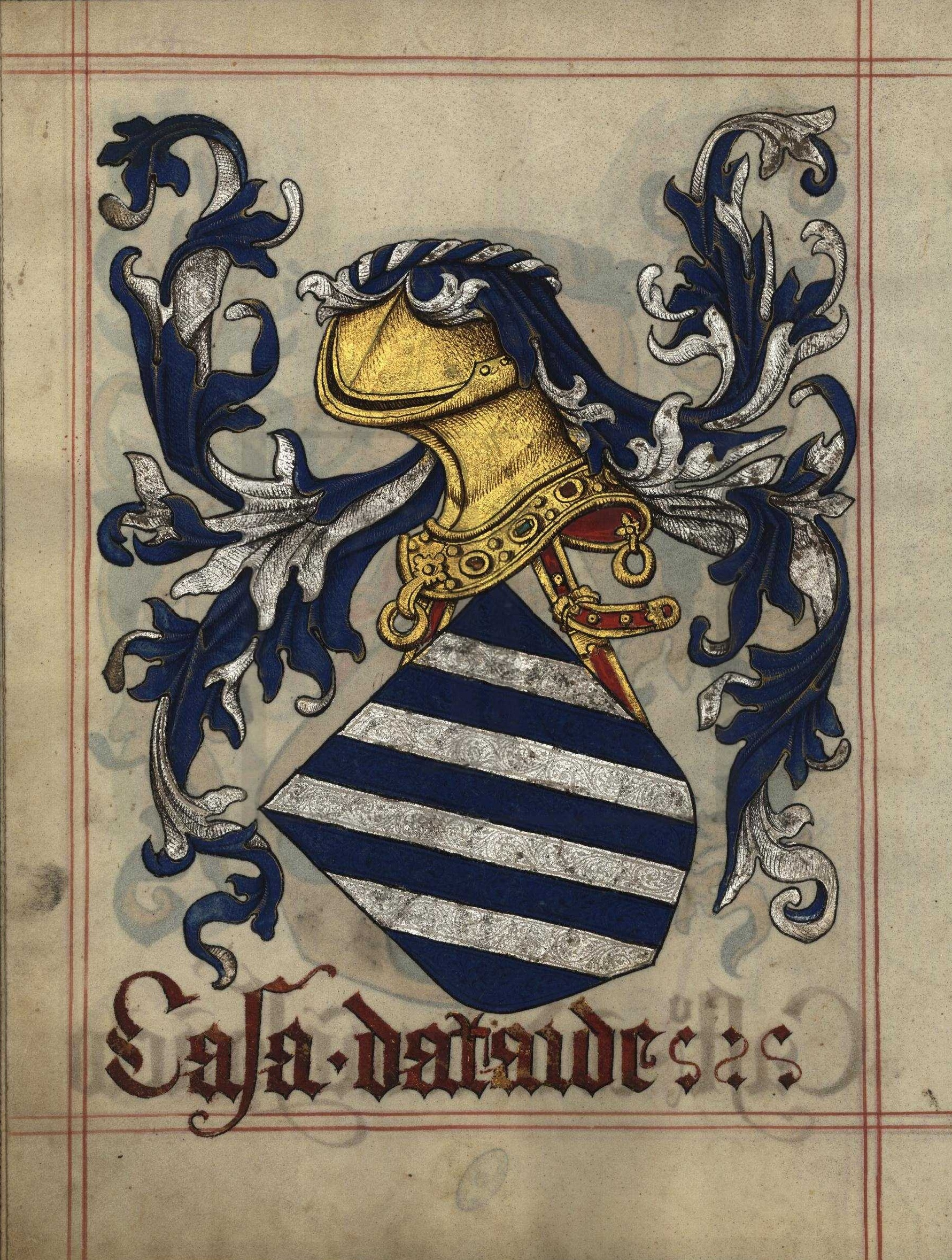
- Coat of Arms of the Ataíde family

Count of Castanheira
- Tenure: 1532–1563
- Predecessor: New title
- Successor: António de Ataíde, 2nd Count of Castanheira
- Other titles: Donatary of the captaincies of Itaparica and Tamarandiva, Brazil (1556)
- Born: 1500; Kingdom of Portugal
- Died: 7 October 1563 (aged 62–63); Kingdom of Portugal
- Buried: Monastery of Santo António da Castanheira
- Family: Ataíde
- Spouse: Ana de Távora
- Father: Dom Álvaro de Ataíde, Lord of Castanheira
- Mother: Violante de Távora
- Occupation: Diplomat, Statesman

Dom António de Ataíde (c. 1500 – 7 October 1563), 1st count of Castanheira, was a childhood friend and favorite of King John III of Portugal (D. João III). As an advisor to the King, he played a key role in Portugal's policies towards its colony of Brazil. He also served as a diplomat in missions to several European countries and was a Minister and member of the King's council.

== Biography ==
He was born in 1500, in a prominent family of the Portuguese nobility. One of his paternal uncles was Dom Martinho de Ataíde, 2nd Count of Atouguia – and two other paternal uncles held the influential position of Prior of Crato (head of the Order of the Knights of St. John of Jerusalem in Portugal) in succession to one another, from 1448 to 1492. Afonso de Albuquerque, the prominent second governor of the Portuguese Estado da Índia, was his first cousin.

His father, Dom Álvaro de Ataíde, senhor (Lord) da Castanheira, had participated in the conspiracy of the Duke of Viseu against king John II and from 1484 to 1496 was exiled in Spain. He was invited back to the kingdom of Portugal by John's successor, king Manuel I. He married for a second time after his return to Portugal. António de Ataíde was the only son from this second marriage.

He was raised at court with the Infante Dom João (later to become King John III) the heir to king Manuel I, who was about the same age. They thus became close friends from early childhood.

John III sent him on diplomatic missions to several European countries while he was still in his 20s and appointed him state councilor in 1525 and then vedor da fazenda (Minister of Finance or chancellor) in 1530, a post that he would hold until the king's death in 1557. He created him 1st Count of Castanheira in 1532.

Ataíde was one of the main proponents of the establishment of the regime of captaincies of Brazil and later on, in 1549, of the creation of the general government of Brazil in the city of Salvador da Baía. As a close advisor to the King he was the key figure behind the nomination of two of his 1st cousins, Martim Afonso de Sousa and Tomé de Sousa to the number one position in the colonial government of Brazil.

On November 10, 1556, by decree of King John III, Ataíde became a Donatary of the captaincy of the islands of Itaparica and Tamarandiva, located at the entrance to the Bay of All Saints (Salvador). He was thus rewarded for the more than two and a half decades that he dedicated to the policies of the Portuguese Crown towards her South American colony.

The King made him a Count when he was still relatively young, thus generating feelings of envy within court circles. Dom António would later comment about that in the following words: "His highness made me a Count, and because I was still younger than almost all the counts of the past, who did not succeed in the title on the death of their parents, it was a great favor, and I received it and I consider it as such".

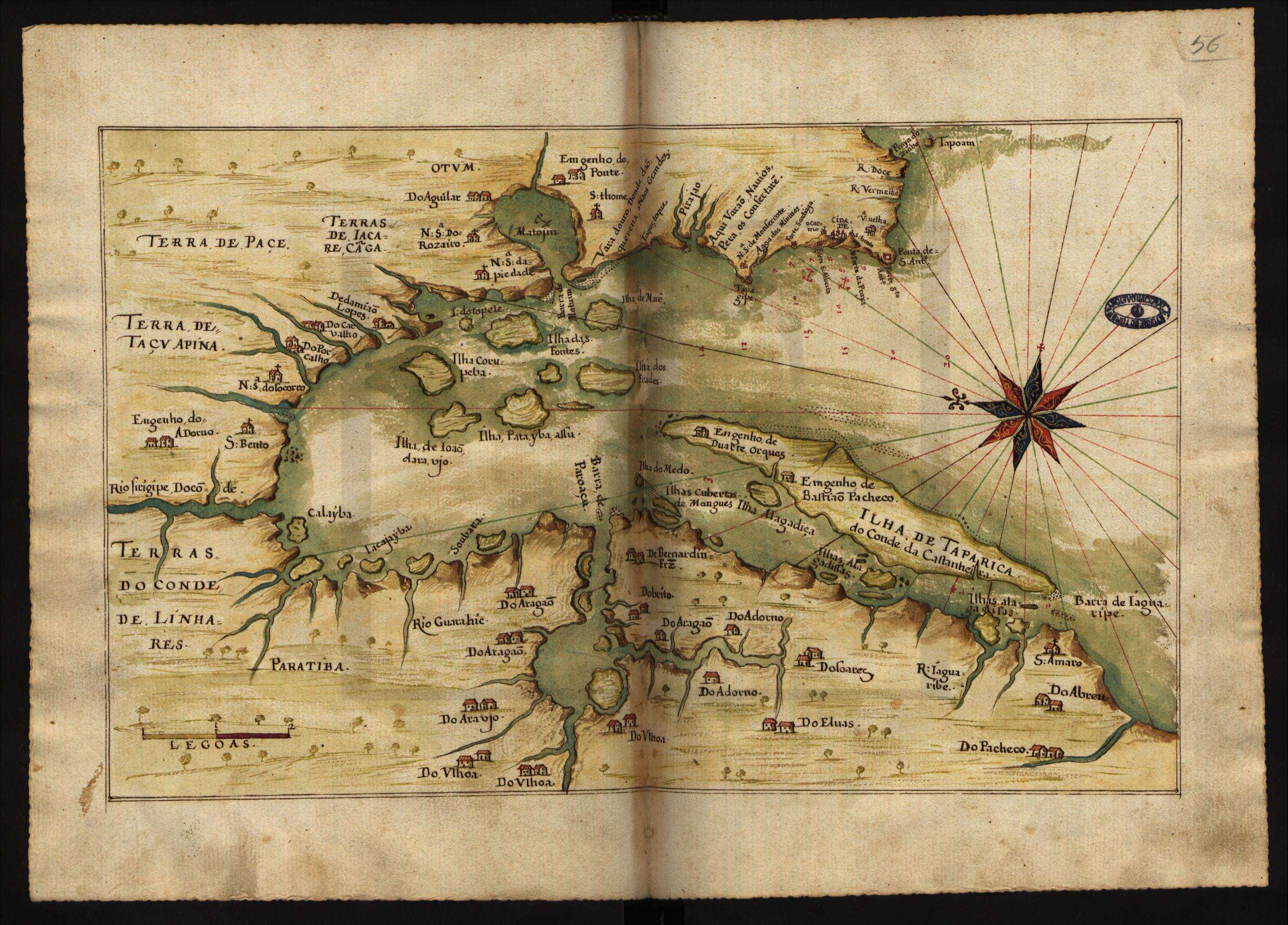
Map of the Bay of All Saints, by João Teixeira Albernaz, showing at its entrance the island of Itaparica, of which Dom António de Ataíde was a Donatary from year 1556

The collection of letters of King John III assembled and published by J D M Ford under the title Letters of John III are full of references to Ataíde and provide a quite clear picture of his role as an adviser and Minister of the King.

He left court service after the death of King João III in 1557. He died on 7 October 1563 and was buried in the Monastery of Santo António da Castanheira.

== Marriage and children ==
He married Ana de Távora, a daughter of the 4th senhor (Lord) de Mogadouro. They had 7 children.

The eldest of the children, Dom António de Ataíde, was the 2nd Count of Castanheira.

Another of his sons, D. Jorge de Ataíde, was bishop of Viseu, Grand Inquisitor of Portugal (a position from which he quickly resigned) and member of the Council of Portugal during the period of the Iberian Union between Portugal and Spain.
