= Pero de Ataíde =

Portuguese explorer

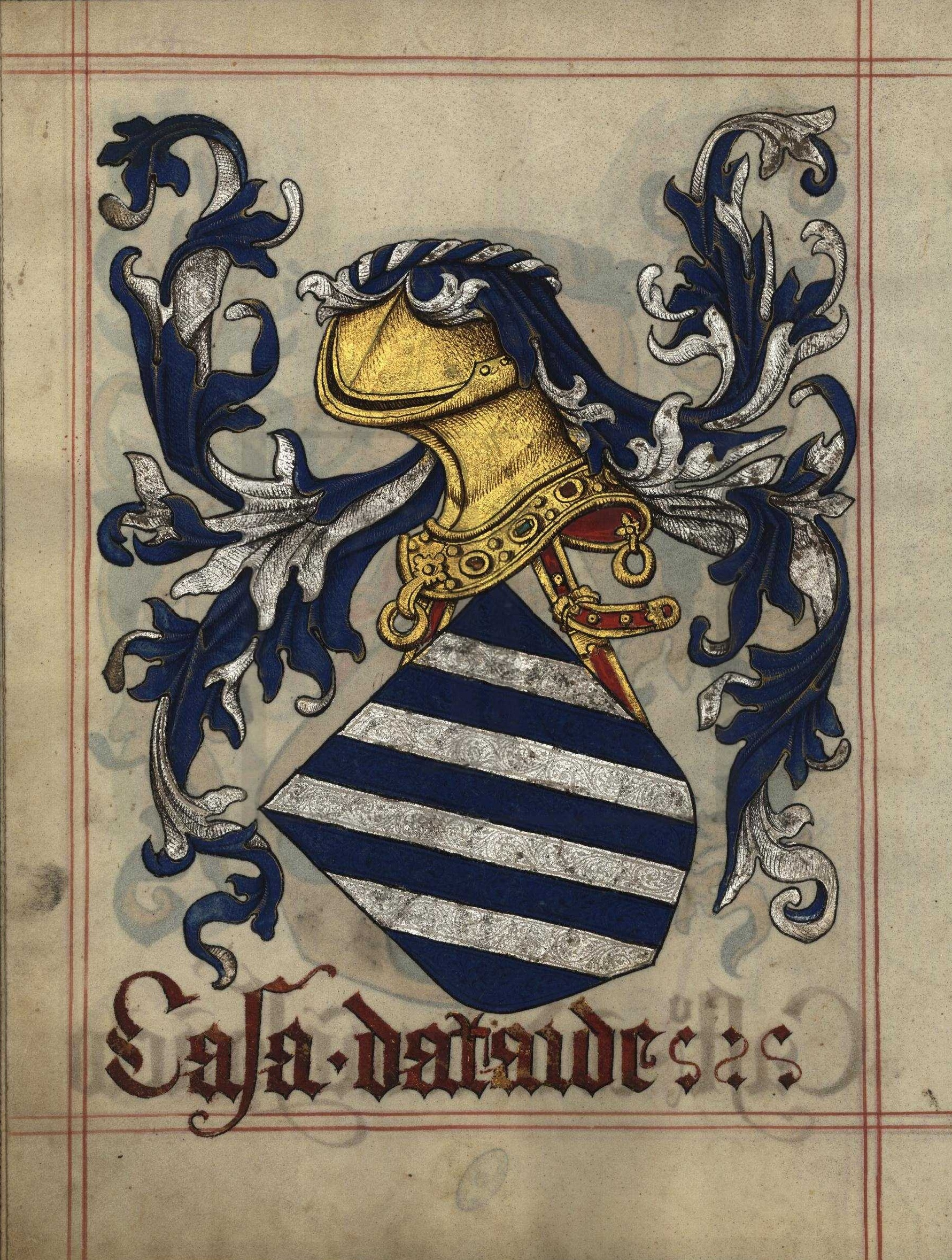
- Coat of Arms of the Ataíde family
- Born: c. 1450; Kingdom of Portugal
- Died: 1504; Mozambique Island, Portuguese Mozambique
- Occupations: Explorer, navigator
- Known for: Captain of the first permanent Portuguese fleet in the Indian Ocean
- Father: Dom Pedro de Ataíde, Abbot of Penalva
- Family: Ataíde

Pero de Ataíde or Pedro d'Ataíde (Note: Pero is an archaic variant of Pedro.) (d'Atayde, da Thayde), nicknamed O Inferno (Hell), "for the damage he did to the Moors in Africa", (c. 1450 – February/March, 1504, Mozambique Island) was a Portuguese sea captain in the Indian Ocean active in the early 1500s. He was briefly captain of the first permanent Portuguese fleet in the Indian Ocean, taking over from Vicente Sodré, and the author of a famous letter giving an account of its fate.

== Background ==
According to chronicler Gaspar Correia, Pero de Ataíde was a "very honored nobleman, a good knight, of virtuous condition" He was one of the three known illegitimate sons of Pedro de Ataíde, Abbot of Penalva do Castelo, himself an illegitimate son of D. Álvaro Gonçalves de Ataíde, the 1st Count of Atouguia. He had two brothers, Vasco de Ataíde and Álvaro Gonçalves de Ataíde, and a sister, Isabel Coutinho.

It is sometimes suggested that Pero de Ataíde was a relative of Portuguese admiral Vasco da Gama. This is probably an error resulting from confusing two unconnected (researchers could never produce documentary evidence of a connection) Portuguese noble families which happen to have the same name - the Ataídes of Atouguia and the Ataídes of Alvor (Algarve). Vasco da Gama married Catarina de Ataíde, daughter of the alcaide-mór of Alvor. There is no indication that she was connected to Pero's family. That members of both Ataíde families were involved in the early construction of the Portuguese Empire in the East Indies has led some historians to assume they were related and contributed to the confusion.

== First journey to India ==
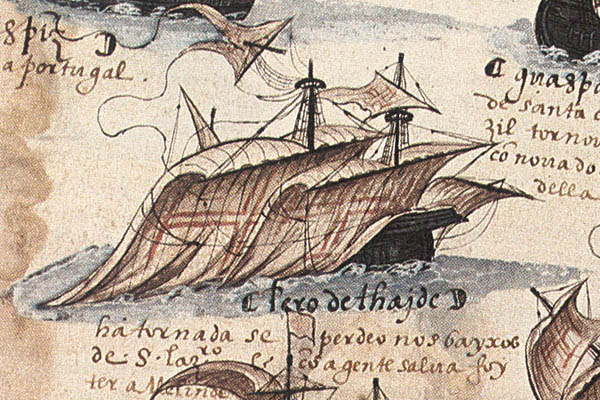
Ship of Pero de Ataíde, detail from the Memória das Armadas

In 1500, Pero de Ataíde and his older brother Vasco de Ataíde joined the 2nd India Armada under the command of Pedro Álvares Cabral. Pero de Ataíde was appointed captain of the São Pedro, a small 70-tonne carrack or square-rigged caravel. His brother Vasco was captain of another unnamed ship.

The armada set out of Lisbon in March 1500, and went on to discover Brazil. Vasco de Ataíde was lost with his ship in late May while attempting to round the Cape of Good Hope

In his most famous exploit in India, Pero de Ataíde was assigned by Cabral to intercept an Arab smuggling ship with a cargo of war elephants, on behalf of the Zamorin of Calicut. The Zamorin himself came to the beach to watch the spectacle, only to leave in disgust when the smuggler deftly slipped past Ataíde's ship. Ataíde gave chase and eventually caught up with it near Cannanore. Ataide personally led his little crew in boarding and defeating the much larger smugglers' crew, and brought back the seized ship with its cargo nearly intact (one pachyderm died in the fighting). Cabral handed the ship and the elephants over to the Zamorin as a gift.

Relations between Cabral and the Zamorin however deteriorated not long after, and the Portuguese were expelled from Calicut.

In April, 1501, on the return journey from India, while pausing at Mozambique Island, the ships were reshuffled and sent off in different waves. Pero de Ataíde was ordered by Cabral to give his ship, the São Pedro, over to vice-admiral Sancho de Tovar (Tovar had run his own ship aground). Ataíde was given command of the larger unnamed nau (or carrack) of Nicolau Coelho (who was in turn transferred over to another ship.) Ataíde was instructed to accompany Cabral and another captain, Simão de Miranda, on the return to Portugal. But Ataíde had difficulties with his heavy-laden, less-maneouverable ship and got separated from the other two around Cape Correntes. He hurried to the usual watering hole, Aguada de São Brás (Mossel Bay) hoping to find them there, but to no avail.

At São Brás, Ataíde wrote a letter relating the state of affairs in India, and warning future Portuguese captains to avoid Calicut, which was now hostile. Ataíde placed the letter in a shoe at Post Office Tree, which he hung by the watering hole in Mossel Bay. Ataíde's letter was found later that year by João da Nova, admiral of the outgoing 3rd armada.

Ataide proceeded on his return journey by himself, finally catching up with the others at Bezeguiche (Dakar, Senegal) in late June. They arrived in Lisbon in July, 1501.

== Second journey to India ==
Pero de Ataíde set out again for India in February 1502, commanding a carrack, the São Paulo, as part of the 4th India Armada of admiral Vasco da Gama. He participated in the many events related to that armada.

In February, 1503, as the armada was about to return to Portugal, Pero de Ataíde was appointed as captain of one of the six caravels that were to remain behind in India as a naval patrol under the command of Vicente Sodré (uncle of Vasco da Gama). This patrol was the first permanent Portuguese fleet in the Indian Ocean. According to some lists, his co-captains were Brás Sodré (Vicente's brother), Pero Rafael, Diogo Pires and Fernão Rodrigues Bardaças. Correia gives a different list, and says Pero de Ataíde was assigned the small nau brought to India by a certain João Fernandes de Mello. It is uncertain who brought Ataíde's carrack, the São Paulo, back to Lisbon.

The naval patrol was ordered by Vasco da Gama to remain close to the Indian coast and protect the Portuguese factories in Cochin and Cannanore. However, after the armada's departure, Vicente Sodré invoked his credentials and led the patrol across the ocean, into the Gulf of Aden, to prey on Arab ships going in and out of the Red Sea. The patrol captains, already upset at leaving the factories unprotected, nearly mutinied when the Sodré brothers set about claiming the lion's share of the booty from captured Arab ships for themselves.

In April 1503, the patrol anchored in at the Khuriya Muriya Islands (off the coast of Oman). They were warned by local inhabitants that a seasonal tempest was forming and that they had better move their ships to a shielded part of the island. Most of the captains went accordingly, but Vicente Sodré and Brás Sodré refused. As predicted, the tempest sunk the ships of the Sodré brothers.

The remaining captains elected Pero de Ataíde as the new captain-major of the patrol. He oversaw the repairs and organized the partitioning of the remaining crews and supplies among the four ships, and then set the patrol on course back to India. Bad weather and contrary winds made it a difficult journey, and they were forced to stop in Anjediva island off the Malabar coast for lengthy repairs. Four days after they arrived, they were surprised to be joined by the caravel of António do Campo (he had been part of the 4th Armada, but had gotten separated back in 1502).

Questions have been raised about the lengthy immobilization of the patrol in Angediva. Given communications along the Indian coast, it would be almost impossible for Ataíde not to be aware that, at that very moment, the Portuguese factory in Cochin was being besieged by the Zamorin of Calicut, and that their compatriots were desperately holding out. It must be assumed that the damage to the patrol ships was too severe to prevent them from sailing to the rescue.

Alternative accounts (esp. Gaspar Correia) however state that most of the intervening time was actually spent stuck on Kura Muria islands, and that the patrol only reached Anjediva in late August and that Ataíde intended to head immediately for Cochin, but was dissuaded from that by the Kolathiri Raja of Cannanore, who warned him he did not have nearly enough men (est. 150) to confront the army of Calicut, and persuaded him to await for reinforcements from the next Portuguese armada, whose scheduled arrival was imminent.

The patrol was still lingering in Anjediva (or in Cannanore according to Correia) in late August/early September when Francisco de Albuquerque, leading the vanguard squad of the 5th Armada stumbled across them. Albuquerque helped the patrol finish their repairs and annexed them to his squad. They proceeded to Cochin and forced the Zamorin to lift the siege.

In the aftermath, Pero de Ataíde took a leading role in several amphibian attacks around the Vembanad lagoon, to punish local princelets who had collaborated with the Zamorin against Cochin.

== Ataíde in Mozambique ==
In January, 1504, Afonso de Albuquerque began organizing the return journey, and determined that Pero de Ataíde was to captain one of the spice-laden naus back to Lisbon (according to Correia, Ataíde was given command of the Espírito Santo that had been brought to India by Duarte Pacheco Pereira, who was to remain behind.).

Pero de Ataíde set out with the first return wave on January 30, 1504, accompanied by two other ships, the nau of Fernão Martins de Almada and the caravel of António do Campo. A disagreement over the course led them to part ways, and Ataíde alighted on the East African coast (around Kilwa) by himself. Proceeding down along the coast (at too much speed, according to Castanheda), Ataíde's heavy-laden ship ran into shoals and capsized. The exact location is uncertain, but probably around the shoals of São Lázaro (modern day Quirimbas Islands, Mozambique). Ataíde lost the ship and cargo, but most of the crew managed to make it safely to the nearby shore. Stranded without supplies and far away from any large settlement (only a small peasant hamlet of four huts was found nearby), Ataíde set aboard a longboat with some fifteen crew members hoping to reach Mozambique Island, promising to arrange for a rescue party to pick up the remainder.

Upon his arrival in Mozambique, Ataíde arranged for the Sheikh of Mozambique to dispatch two paraus to pick up his shipwrecked crew. As they were about to depart, the ship of António do Campo appeared in Mozambique harbor. However, despite Ataíde's entreaties, Campo refused to join the rescue mission. Indeed, if Ataíde's account is to be believed, Campo even refused to share any of his supplies or cash with Ataíde or the shipwrecked crew, leaving them to "beg the Moors" for food. Campo set out once again, taking only two or three of Ataíde's sailors, leaving the rest behind in Mozambique.

Evidently thinking that Campo would deliver an unfavorable report in Lisbon, Pero de Ataíde, already feverishly ill (probably malaria), set down to compose his famous letter to King Manuel I of Portugal in February, 1504, hoping to send it forward on the next Portuguese ship. In the letter, Ataíde gives an account of the travails of Vicente Sodré's Indian Ocean patrol, and the behavior (and fate) of the Sodré brothers (Brás Sodré comes out as the villain of the story). He proceeds to explain the loss of his ship, complete with repeated impeachments of the character and behavior of António do Campo. He rounds off the letter reminding the king of his loyal service and petitioning the monarch to bestow upon him the offices and benefices of the citadel of Tomar, which had belonged to the late Vicente Sodré.

Pero de Ataíde died shortly after finishing the letter. The outgoing 6th Armada under Lopo Soares de Albergaria picked up Ataíde's letter in late July 1504, when it stopped by Mozambique Island.

== Sources ==
- Pero de Ataíde "Carta de Pero de Atayde a El-rei D. Manuel, Fevereiro 20, 1504", as published in Bulhão Pato, R.A. editor, 1898, Cartas de Affonso de Albuquerque, seguidas de documentos que as elucidam. Lisbon: Academia Real de Sciencias, vol. 2 p.262-268.
- Aubin, J. (1995) "Preface", in Voyages de Vasco de Gama: relations des expéditions de 1497-1499 & 1502-1503. Paris: Chandeigne.
- João de Barros (1552–59) Décadas da Ásia: Dos feitos, que os Portuguezes fizeram no descubrimento, e conquista, dos mares, e terras do Oriente..
- Fernão Lopes de Castanheda (1551–1560) História do descobrimento & conquista da Índia pelos portugueses [1833 edition] Lib 1, Ch. 44
- Gaspar Correia (c. 1550s) Lendas da Índia, pub. 1858-64, Lisbon: Academia Real de Sciencias
- Manuel de Faria e Sousa (1666) Asia Portuguesa, Vol. 1.
- Damião de Goes (1566–67) Crónica do Felicíssimo Rei D. Manuel
- João Paulo Oliveira e Costa, (2000) Descobridores do Brasil: exploradores do Atlântico e construtores do Estado da Índia. Sociedade Histórica da Independência de Portugal
- Visconde de Sanches da Baena (1897) O Descobridor do Brazil, Pedro Alvares Cabral: memoria apresentada á Academia real das sciencias de Lisboa. Lisbon online
- Subrahmanyam, S. (1997) The Career and Legend of Vasco da Gama. Cambridge, UK: Cambridge University Press.
- Whiteway, R. S. (1899) The Rise of Portuguese Power in India, 1497-1550. Westminster: Constable.
