= Filipa de Vilhena =

Portuguese countess (1585-1651)

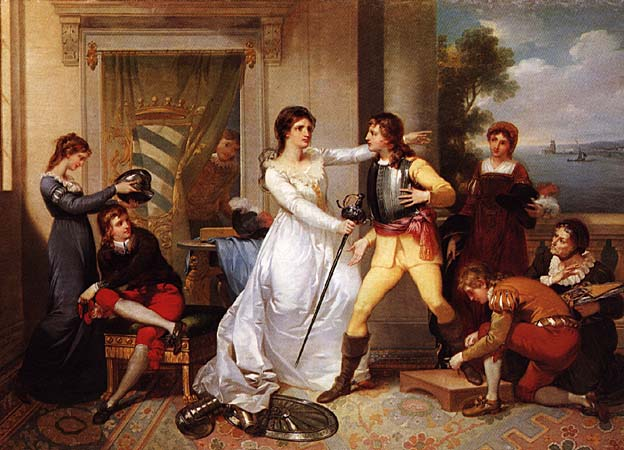
Filipa de Vilhena knighting her sons (1801) painting by Vieira Portuense.

Filipa de Vilhena (c. 1585 – 1 April 1651), countess and marchioness of Atouguia, was a Portuguese courtier.

== Biography ==
She was the wife of D. Luís de Ataíde, 5th Count of Atouguia, and served as principal lady-in-waiting to queen Luisa de Guzmán.

She became known for her legendary farewell to her sons when they left to participate in the 1640 revolution in Lisbon, that overthrew the rule of the Spanish Habsburgs in Portugal, thus ending the 60-year period of the Iberian Union. She armed her sons as knights and asked them not to return unless covered in glory. Both sons later fought in the Portuguese Restoration War, and the eldest son, Dom Jerónimo de Ataíde, 6th count of Atouguia, went on to serve as governor of colonial Brazil.

She became famous as a symbol of Portuguese patriotism and a subject of a famous play by Almeida Garrett and a painting by Vieira Portuense.

After the installation of the Bragança dynasty as the ruling family of Portugal, she was made principal lady-in-waiting to the queen.

=== On Television ===
In 1988 the Portuguese state-owned television channel RTP produced and broadcast a new version of Almeida Garrett's play dedicated to D. Filipa de Vilhena.
