= Leonardo Ataíde =

Brazilian footballer

Personal information
- Full name: Leonardo Ataíde de Oliveira Siqueira
- Date of birth: 19 January 2004 (age 22)
- Place of birth: Piracicaba, São Paulo, Brazil
- Position: Right-back

Team information
- Current team: Brusque (on loan from Cuiabá)

Youth career
- –2022: Athletico Paranaense

Senior career*
Years	Team	Apps	(Gls)
2022–2025	Athletico Paranaense	4	(0)
2025–	Cuiabá	16	(0)
2026–	→ Brusque (loan)	11	(0)

International career^{‡}
2019	Brazil U15		
2019	Brazil U16	4	(0)
- * Club domestic league appearances and goals as of 9 November 2026 ‡ National team caps and goals as of 14 February 2022

Leonardo Ataíde de Oliveira Siqueira (born 19 January 2004) is a Brazilian professional footballer who plays as a right-back for Brusque, on loan from Cuiabá.

== Career statistics ==
=== Club ===
As of 14 February 2022.

Club	Season	League			State League		Cup		Continental		Other		Total	
Club	Season	Division	Apps	Goals	Apps	Goals	Apps	Goals	Apps	Goals	Apps	Goals	Apps	Goals
Athletico Paranaense	2022	Série A	0	0	4 (Note: Appearances in the Campeonato Paranaense)	0	0	0	—		0	0	4	0
Career total			0	0	4	0	0	0	0	0	0	0	4	0
