= Fernão Teles de Meneses =

Fernão Teles de Meneses (1431 — Alcácer do Sal, 1 April 1477), also known as Fernão Teles and Fernão da Silva, was a Portuguese fidalgo and soldier.

== Early career ==
Together with his elder brother, João da Silva, and their father, Aires Gomes da Silva, Teles fought at the Battle of Alfarrobeira (1449) for Peter, Duke of Coimbra. Following the defeat and death of the Duke, and loyal to the exiled Peter, Constable of Portugal, Teles and his brother, left for Spain (where Teles is documented as Fernando Telles de Meneses, or Fernando Téllez de Meneses.).

Teles was pardoned by Afonso V of Portugal in April 1451.

Teles is documented in Ceuta, then a Portuguese possession, in 1452 and again in 1454, this time in the company of his brother João da Silva.

Although it is not known when he was appointed by Queen Consort Isabel to be warden of the castle at Sintra, this post was ratified on her death in 1455. A few years later, in 1461, Teles renounced the wardenship in favour of his elder brother, João da Silva.

== Spain ==
In Castile, Teles was tasked in May 1464 with the mission of recruiting three hundred knights for Peter, Constable of Portugal, disputed King of Aragon. The following July, in the midst of the dismay caused by the loss of Lleida, he informed Peter that he would arrive in Tortosa, at the head of an army of five hundred Portuguese and Castilian troops.

Fernão Teles commanded his troops in several combats in the mountainous areas of Barcelona and Girona. Confrontation soon arose between Teles and the Generalitat de Catalunya, jealous of the prerogatives he held, in which he was defended by Peter. One of the reasons for the conflicts were the goods confiscated from the Muntanyans.

The confrontation reached its peak during the autumn of 1465, when he was appointed captain general of the Pyrenean region, a jurisdiction comprising Camprodon, Sant Joan de les Abadesses, Ripoll, and the castles of La Guardia, La Roca and Blanca.

The situation worsened on 8 March 1466 when the king, against the will of the Generalitat de Catalunya, appointed Teles captain general of the Catalan province of Empordà and gave him the Bishopric of Girona, replacing his brother João da Silva, who had travelled to England on a diplomatic mission. His position became so untenable that the following June the deputies, taking advantage of the king's illness, devised a plan to imprison him. The plan never came to fruition, as the king, who died at the end of that month, had determined in his will that Teles remain in command of the Empordà, leading the Generalitat to write to Teles shortly afterwards in very generous terms. However, by February 1469, Teles was back in Portugal.

In 1471, he was appointed a member of King Afonso V's Council and in January 1474, the king appointed Teles governor of the house of Joanna, Princess of Portugal, and granted him the annual tenure of thirty thousand Portuguese reales as well as the ownership of any island he discovered.

Teles fought alongside King Afonso V at the Battle of Toro (March 1476) against the Catholic Monarchs.

== Death ==
Teles died after being struck on the head by a stone while trying to resolve a street fight in Alcácer do Sal on 1 April 1477.

== Bibliography ==
- Moreno, Humberto Baquero (1980). A Batalha de Alfarrobeira. Antecedentes e Significado Histórico [The Battle of Alfarrobeira. Background and Historical Significance]. Vol. II. Biblioteca Geral da Universidade, Coimbra. OCLC 8590873.
