= Martim Afonso de Sousa =

Portuguese explorer

Martim Afonso de Sousa, Lord of Prado and Alcoentre
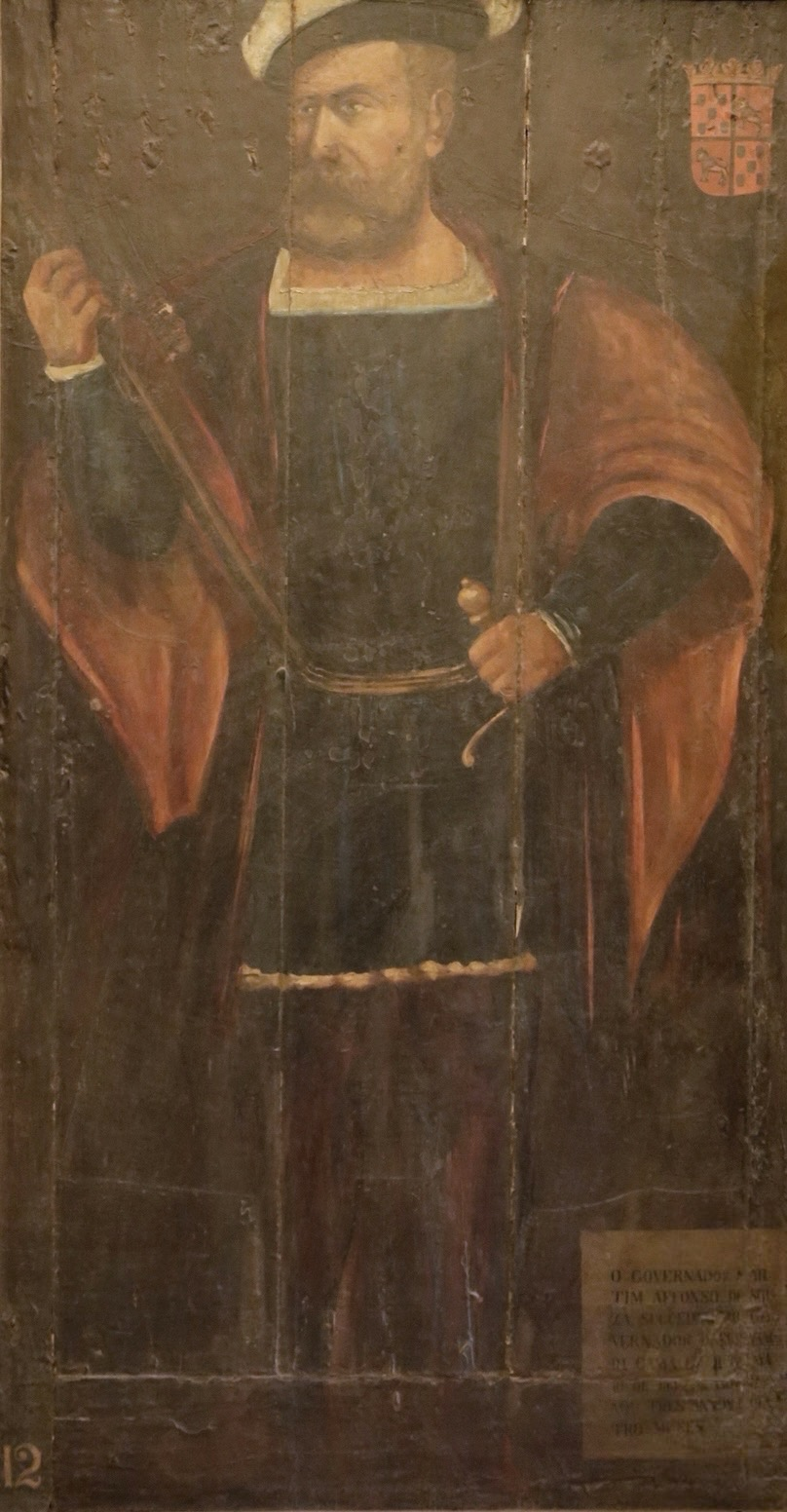

Governor of India
- In office 1542–1545
- Monarch: John III
- Preceded by: Estêvão da Gama
- Succeeded by: João de Castro

Captain-major of São Vicente
- In office 1533–1564
- Monarchs: John III; Sebastian
- Preceded by: Office established
- Succeeded by: Pero Lopes de Sousa

Personal details
- Born: c. 1500 Vila Viçosa, Kingdom of Portugal
- Died: 21 July 1564 (aged 63–64) Lisbon, Kingdom of Portugal
- Spouse: Ana Pimentel
- Children: Pero Lopes de Sousa; Lopo Rodrigues de Sousa; Rodrigo Afonso de Sousa; Gonçalo Rodrigues de Sousa; Inês Pimentel; Brites Pimentel b. Tristão de Sousa b. Isabel Lopes de Sousa
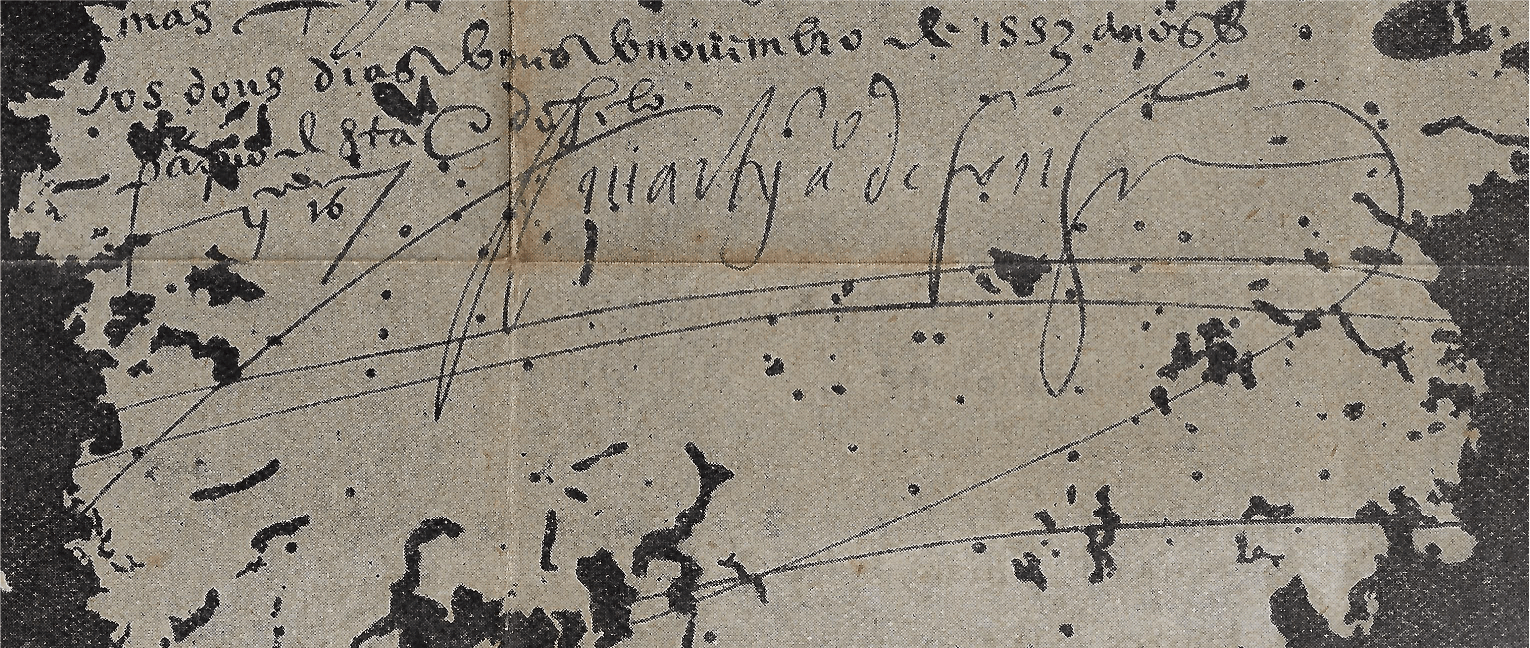
- Signature

Military service
- Allegiance: Portuguese Empire
- Rank: Captain-Major
- Battles/wars: Ottoman–Portuguese conflicts (1538–1557)

Martim Afonso de Sousa (c. 1500 – 21 July 1564) was a Portuguese fidalgo, explorer and colonial administrator.

== Early life, family and education ==
Martim Afonso de Sousa was born in Vila Viçosa, and had been raised in the Duke of Bragança household and was a cousin and personal friend since childhood of King John III of Portugal.

When he left the service of the Duke of Bragança, in 1516, to stay at the court of the Royal House, he began to study mathematics, cosmography and geography with the chief cosmographer Pedro Nunes. He justified the decision by saying: "The duke can make me mayor, but the king can make me duke", but that never happened.

== Marriage and military service ==
After the death of Manuel I of Portugal, he accompanied the widowed Queen D. Leonor of Austria to Castile, where he married Ana Pimentel, from an illustrious Spanish family, around June 1523. Ana Pimentel was the daughter of Arias Maldonado, commendator of Estriana and governor of Salamanca and Talavera and of D. Joana Pimentel, daughter of D. Pedro Pimentel, Lord of Távara and sister of D. Bernardino Pimentel, 1st Marquis of Távara. The mother of Martim Afonso de Sousa's wife was thus a descendant, on her paternal side, of the Pimentel Counts of Benavente, a lineage of Portuguese origin that passed to Spain in the 14th century; and, on her maternal side, she descended from the Counts of Alba de Liste. This means that, through his marriage, Martim Afonso de Sousa became linked to some of the main lineages in Spain. At the time, it was unusual for non-titled Portuguese noblemen to marry Spanish women who came — even if, as in this case, through female origin — from families of the greatness of Spain, so it can be concluded that Martim Afonso managed to successfully develop a strategy of marriage alliance with positive repercussions in terms of his political career and connections with power in the first court of the Iberian Peninsula.

In Spain, where he lived for four years, he fought in the service of Emperor Charles V against the French. In the winter of 1525, Martim Afonso played a prominent role in the siege and capture of Fuenterrabía, in northwestern Spain. The emperor publicly praised him and invited him to remain in Castile.

== Expedition to Brazil ==
Around 1530, King John III determined to send an official Portuguese expedition to Brazil, and Martim Afonso de Souza was appointed by his first cousin Dom António de Ataíde, 1st Count of Castanheira, member of the Royal Council. Ataíde made this appointment with the intention of distancing Martim Afonso from King John III, so that he would be the only one to have a certain influence on the King.

Threatened by the presence of French ships along the coast of Brazil, the Portuguese crown in December 1530 sent a fleet with 400 people led by Martim Afonso de Sousa to establish control and explore. His mission was to place Portuguese markers as far south as the River Plate estuary, but he was shipwrecked there.

Upon his return to São Vicente and Santos, in 1532 he led troops guided by the native inhabitants and by earlier Portuguese settlers such as João Ramalho up the Serra do Mar mountains to the area near the future village of São Paulo. On the high plateau, he founded the town of Santo André. He also established a sugar mill near the coast at São Vicente, with sugarcane brought from the Portuguese Cape Verde islands. In both activities, Afonso de Sousa established a pattern followed by Portuguese colonizers and Brazilians for long afterward: the "entradas" and "bandeiras" – or explorations and raids into the interior – and the production of sugar along the coast for export.

He fought French privateers on the coast and was honored by the Portuguese crown, under the reign of King John III, as Donatary captain of two tracts of land in Brazil: the two tracts of the Captaincy of São Vicente. After he left Portugal, he received communication from the king that the immense territory would be divided into extensive strips of land: hereditary captaincies. On that occasion, he was given one hundred leagues on the coast and he was authorized to return to Lisbon. He was authorized to choose another eighty leagues for his younger brother Pero Lopes de Sousa.

== Back to the Kingdom ==
In 1533 he was already back in Portugal. Then on December 19, 1533, four months after he had returned from his tiring journey, King John III sent him to serve in India with the post of Captain-Major of the Indian Sea. To this end, he was entrusted with the leadership of five ships. According to chronicler Gaspar Correia, in Legends of India, "Martim Afonso was very disgusted by the decision, because he felt that it was coming from D. António".

== Governor of Portuguese India ==
He was tasked with protecting Portugal's possessions in the East. He defended the trading post of Diu against Moors and Hindus, defeated the Zamorin of Calicut and fought the corsairs who plundered Portuguese vessels in the region. He agreed to build the Fortress of Diu, obtained through negotiations by Martim Afonso de Sousa when he was in Chaul in 1535. Victorious, he was appointed by the King as Viceroy of the Indies. These and other situations earned him respect and fear in Asia and returning to the Kingdom.

== Later life and demise ==
There is controversy regarding the end of his career. Some historians claim that he returned to Portugal in 1545 or 1546, becoming one of the members of the Council of State. Others maintain that he was recalled on charges of embezzlement of Crown money and illicit enrichment, remaining away from public life until his death.

He was Lord of Alcoentre, which he bought from the Marquis of Vila Real and Mayor of Rio Maior. He established a morgue, was a donatary captain of the captaincies of São Vicente and Rio de Janeiro, Commendator of Mascarenhas in the Order of Christ and Nobleman of the Council of King John III. At the end of his life, he regained the landlordship of the town of Prado that he had sold as a young man.

He died on July 21, 1564 and lies in the Convent of São Francisco da Cidade, in Lisbon.
