= Castanheira do Ribatejo e Cachoeiras =

- Civil parish
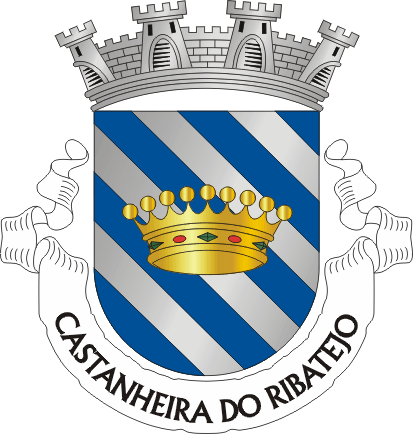
- Coat of arms

- Location in Portugal
- Coordinates: 38.99°N 8.97°W
- Country: Portugal
- Region: Lisbon
- Metropolitan area: Lisbon
- District: Lisbon
- Municipality: Vila Franca de Xira

Area
  - Total: 26.78 km^{2} (10.34 sq mi)

Population (2011)
  - Total: 8,266
  - Density: 310/km^{2} (800/sq mi)
- Time zone: UTC+00:00 (WET)
  - Summer (DST): UTC+01:00 (WEST)

Castanheira do Ribatejo e Cachoeiras is a civil parish in the municipality of Vila Franca de Xira, Portugal. It was formed in 2013 by the merger of the former parishes Castanheira do Ribatejo and Cachoeiras. The population in 2011 was 8,266, in an area of 26.78 km^{2}.
