= Honra =

Former type of administrative division in Portugal

A honra was an administrative division and a form of lordship that existed in the Kingdom of Portugal prior to 1834 - a land, or district, whose jurisdiction and income belonged to a Lord or Fidalgo.

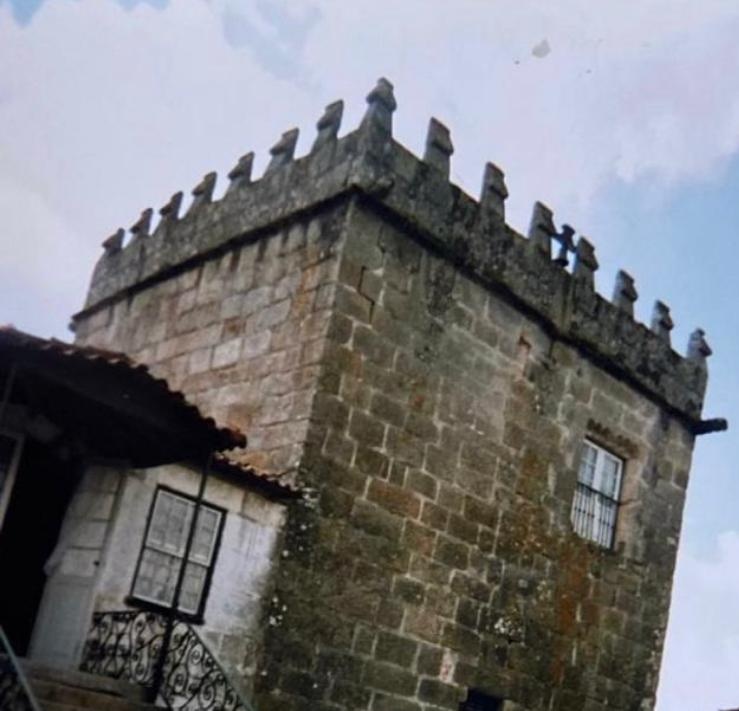
The tower of the honra de Barbosa, near Penafiel, founded in the 12th century by Dom Mem Moniz de Ribadouro, an example of a medieval domain in Portugal that took the form of honra

== History and characteristics ==
Along with the coutos, the honras were manifestations of medieval manorialism in the Kingdom of Portugal. These were forms of property that could belong both to lay Lords (the honras) and to ecclesiastical Lords (the coutos, which in the beginning could belong to either one or the other, but after the Middle Ages in most cases came to be in the hands of the Church).

Honras and coutos - made up of one or more parishes, or parts of parishes - had in common the characteristic of immunity, which resulted in the exemption from tax charges before the Crown, the right to administer civil and criminal justice by the respective Lords and the right to prevent the entry of royal officials.

The main characteristic that differentiated honras from coutos was the fact that the honras were a form of "spontaneously generated" Lordship.

While the coutos were normally created by the "charter of the couto", which - as an expression of royal authority - expressly delimited the territory of the couto and specified the scope of the powers that the Lords could exercise, the honras were never originally a royal act. Therefore, they were not gifts bestowed by the power of the King but rather impositions on the crown, made by powerful Feudal Lords. The honras' original constitutions were linked to the so-called "Reconquista" movement, during which several Portuguese noble families managed to impose their political and territorial influence independently of royal concessions. This connection to the Reconquista explains the absence of honras in the south of Portugal. They were concentrated mainly in the northern part of the country, where - many centuries later, at the end of the 17th century - provinces such as Entre Douro e Minho had still a total of 21 honras.

The honras thus had their original legitimation in the strength and prestige of a social class (the early-medieval warrior nobility) and the crown's intervention to curtail the powers of that class only appeared in a later period, first by recognizing these pre-existing situations and then by seeking to control them, namely through the Inquirições. During the reign of King Denis, the Inquirições distinguished between the "old" honras, which were recognized, and the "new" honras, which were considered abusive and illegitimate because they were of recent formation. The crown thus recognized acquired rights, at the same time as it sought to limit the expansion of the Lords' powers and influence.

The honras continued to exist in Portugal in the Modern era (they were extinguished, together with the other territorial domains of the nobility, in 1834). By then, however, they were already subject to the general regime applicable to Lordships (that is, to the provisions of the so-called Lei Mental, that only allowed the succession of property and lordships, in a noble family, when there was a legitimate male son to inherit them), namely with regard to the process of royal confirmations - either by more or less automatic succession or by express confirmation made by a new King. Royal confirmations were thus a method for making the Lords and donataries of the honras recognize royal authority.
