= Martinho de Ataíde, 2nd Count of Atouguia =

Portuguese courtier (c.1415-1499)

Martinho de Ataíde
- 2nd Count of Atouguia
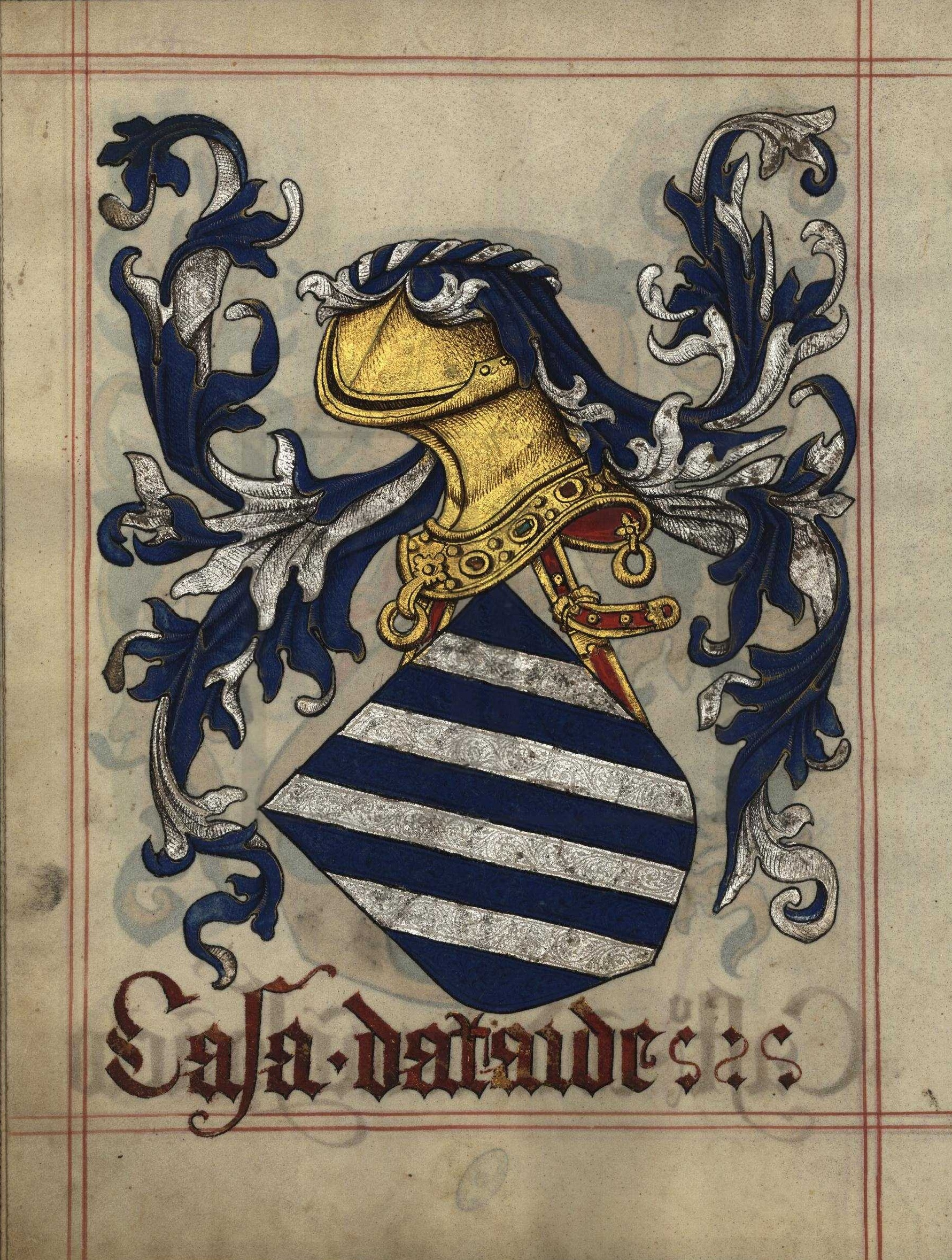
- Coat of Arms of the Ataíde family

Count of Atouguia
- Tenure: 1452–1499
- Predecessor: Álvaro Gonçalves de Ataíde, 1st Count of Atouguia
- Successor: Luís de Ataíde, 3rd Count of Atouguia
- Other titles: Lord of the Castle of Monforte (1452); Lord of the Canary Islands (1464)
- Born: c. 1415; Kingdom of Portugal
- Died: 1499 (aged 83–84); Kingdom of Portugal
- Noble family: Ataíde
- Spouse: Filipa de Azevedo
- Issue: João de Ataíde
- Father: D. Álvaro Gonçalves de Ataíde, 1st Count of Atouguia
- Mother: Guiomar de Castro
- Occupation: Statesman, Diplomat

Dom Martinho de Ataíde (c. 1415 – 1499), 2nd Count of Atouguia, was a 15th-century Portuguese nobleman and diplomat. In 1464, he was granted a partial lordship of the Canary Islands, by donation from King Henry IV of Castile.

== Biography ==
He was the eldest son of Álvaro Gonçalves de Ataíde, 1st Count of Atouguia and Dona Guiomar de Castro, of the House of Cadaval.

He succeeded in the title, shortly after his father's death, by a royal decree from Afonso V of Portugal, dated 14 February 1452. He thus became the 2nd Count of Atouguia, his title being later confirmed by royal letters of 1482 and 1487.

=== Missions in Ceuta and Castile ===
He was with his father at the Battle of Alfarrobeira, on the side of King Afonso V. The sovereign, soon after making him Count, sent him on a mission to the Portuguese fortress of Ceuta, accompanied by Fernando I, 4th Count of Arraiolos and later 2nd Duke of Bragança (1403 - 1478), with the aim of convincing the King's brother, the Infante Dom Fernando, later Duke of Viseu, to return to Portugal (the Infante was planning to stay in Ceuta, in order to fight the Moors). The mission was crowned with success and shortly afterwards Afonso V appointed one of the brothers of the Count of Atouguia, Dom Vasco de Ataíde, to the influential position of Prior do Crato (head of the Order of the Knights of St. John of Jerusalem in Portugal), in succession to another of his brothers, Dom João de Ataíde, who had precociously passed away.

In 1455, the monarch sent Dom Martinho (together with his mother, Dona Guiomar de Castro) on a diplomatic mission to Castile, for which he received the hefty sum of 1355 dobras. The mission consisted in officially accompanying the Infanta Joan of Portugal to Castile, for the celebration of her marriage to King Henry IV.

=== Lordship of the Canary Islands ===
According to Portuguese sources, starting with the 16th century historian João de Barros, on that same occasion, Ataíde - probably at the instance of Prince Henry, the Navigator - expressed an interest in receiving from Castile, as a donation from Henry IV, the Canary Islands. After the donation took place, the islands (Gran Canaria, Tenerife and La Palma) would be sold by Dom Martinho to the Count of Viana and finally - in 1466 - by Viana to the King's brother-in-law, the Infante D. Fernando.

However, more recent research by Spanish historians points to the year 1464 as the date of this concession, granted by King Henry IV of Castile simultaneously to the Counts of Atouguia and Vila Real, and concerning the aforementioned islands of Gran Canaria and Tenerife and the island of La Palma.

The meeting between the two Portuguese nobles and the king took place in Gibraltar on January 6 and 7, 1464. Both Dom Martinho and the Count of Vila Real (who was also captain of Portuguese Ceuta) were part of the entourage of King Afonso V, who met with the Castilian sovereign on those dates and pressured him for a grant in favor of the two noblemen of his Council. The delicate internal situation faced by Henry IV, dealing with revolts in his kingdom and a general state of indiscipline in the Canary Islands, which made him eager to obtain Afonso V's support, was the reason that determined this concession.

In practice, however, and despite all the efforts to claim possession of the Canaries throughout much of the 15th century, Portugal never managed to mobilize the necessary resources to dominate them.

=== Period of relative absence from the royal court ===
In the years that elapsed between the death of the Infante Fernando, in 1470, and the end of the reign of Afonso V, in 1481, the Count of Atouguia often chose to stay away from the royal court, where he had been one of the most influential political figures. One reason for his absences may have been his disappointment with the fact that, during the 1470s, the annual sum granted by the crown to the House of Atouguia, of 102 thousand Reais, became lower than the amounts provided to titled houses close to the Ataídes by kinship ties, such as those of Marialva (lineage: Coutinho), Monsanto (Castro) and Atalaia (Melo).

In addition, one of the brothers of the Count of Atouguia, Dom Álvaro de Ataíde, ended up inheriting (in 1480) the estates of one branch of the Melo family, as a son-in-law of the 1st Count of Atalaia, Dom Pedro de Melo - thus creating within the lineage of the Ataídes a House with the potential to rival that of Atouguia. And the fact that the only son of Dom Martinho decided to follow a religious life, taking the vow of novice at the age of 16, against his father's express wishes, was another complicating factor for the position of the House of Atouguia in the hierarchy of Portuguese counts, in the last quarter of the 15th century.

=== Non-participation in the plots of the nobility against King John II ===
After these mishaps, however, Martinho de Ataíde would have many opportunities to show his strong skills in political maneuvering, in the complex courtly environment of political intrigue that marked the first years of the reign of King João II.

He prudently kept his distances from the events that would lead to the execution of the Duke of Bragança, Fernando II, in 1483. In a famous letter that he wrote from Cáceres (between the end of 1482 and May 1483), in coded language, to his nephew the Duke, the Count of Atouguia made subtle references to the plot against the King that was being set up in courtly circles, and proved his wisdom, by telling the Duke that "you should not deal with that, let alone commit it".

The House of Atouguia was thus able to go unscathed through the alleged plot of the Duke of Bragança against the King. Likewise, Dom Martinho stayed away from the subsequent conspiracy directed by Dom Diogo, Duke of Viseu, which would end up victimizing many prominent Portuguese nobles, including two members of the Ataíde family - the Count's brother, the aforementioned Dom Álvaro, who had to flee in haste to Castile in order to escape a death sentence, and Dom Álvaro's son, Pedro de Ataíde, beheaded in Setúbal for the crime of Lèse-majesté.

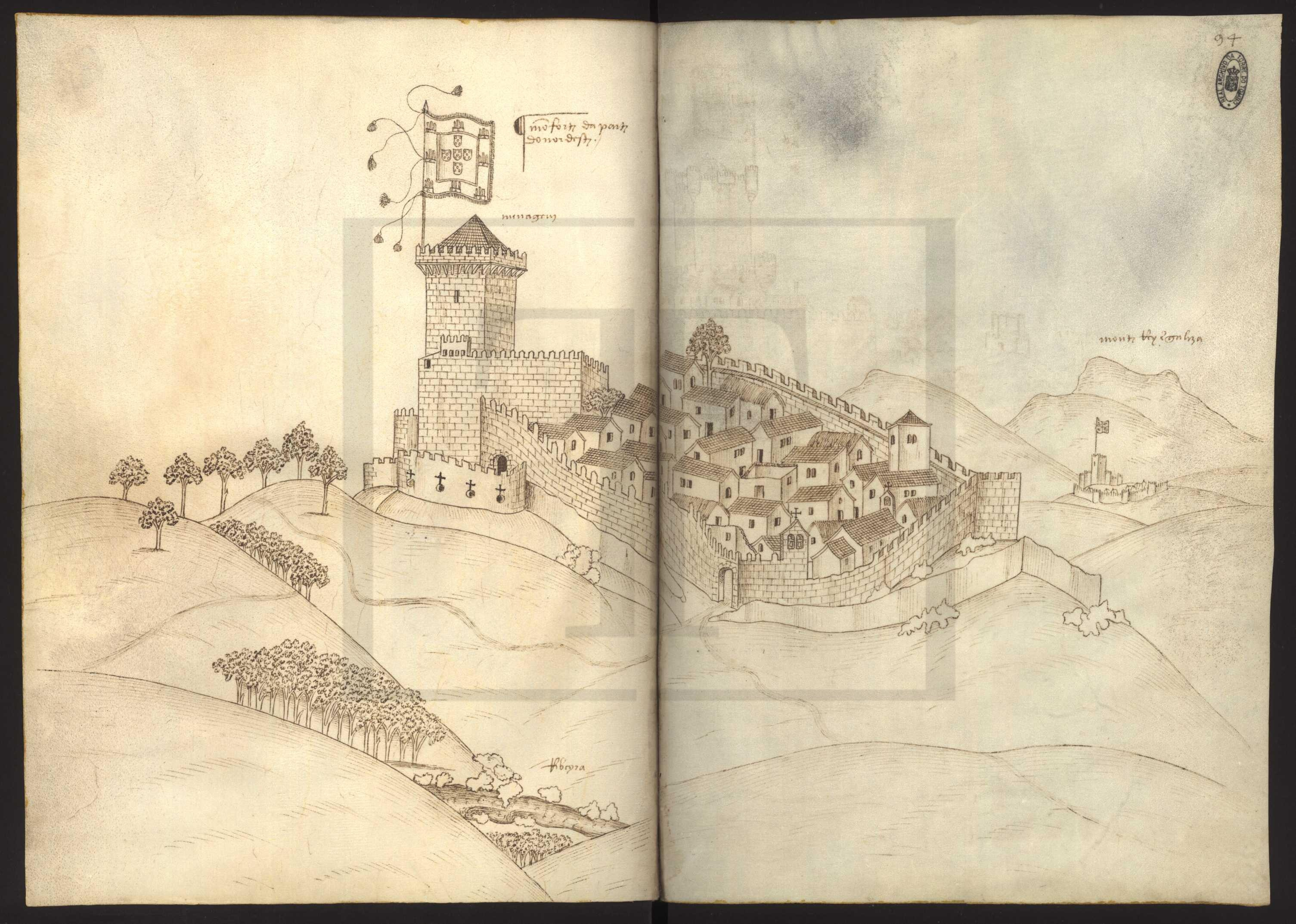
The Castle of Monforte, donated by King Afonso V to Martinho de Ataíde in 1452

=== Other Titles ===
Martinho de Ataíde was granted several other titles and fiefdoms by King Afonso V, namely:

- Lord of the Castle of Monforte do Rio Livre
- Lord of Vinhais
- Alcaide-mor of the Castle of Coimbra

He was also mordomo-mor of the House of the Infante Dom Fernando, brother of King Afonso V.

He died in 1498 or – more probably – 1499. When he died, he was one of the ten existing Portuguese Counts, at the end of the 15th Century.

== Marriage and children ==
He married twice.

His first wife was his first cousin, Dona Catarina de Castro, daughter of Dom Fernando de Castro, governor of the household of Prince Henry the Navigator (Catarina was a widow from a previous marriage to Álvaro Vaz de Almada, 1st Count of Avranches). The marriage took place in 1451, was dissolved by his wife's death, on 1 November 1453, and left no issue.

He married again, on 18 April 1457. His second wife was Dona Filipa de Azevedo, daughter of Luís Gonçalves Malafaia, Ambassador to Castille and to Rome and one of the legendary Twelve of England. The couple had a son:

- Dom João de Ataíde, who married Dona Brites da Silva, a daughter of the Count of Penela. Their grandson, Dom Luís de Ataíde, would be the 3rd Count of Atouguia.

Preceded by Álvaro Gonçalves de Ataíde (1448 – 1452)	Count of Atouguia; Martinho de Ataíde (1452 - 1499)	Succeeded by Luís de Ataíde (1577 – 1581)
