= Count of Atouguia =

Extinct Portuguese title of nobility

Counts of Atouguia
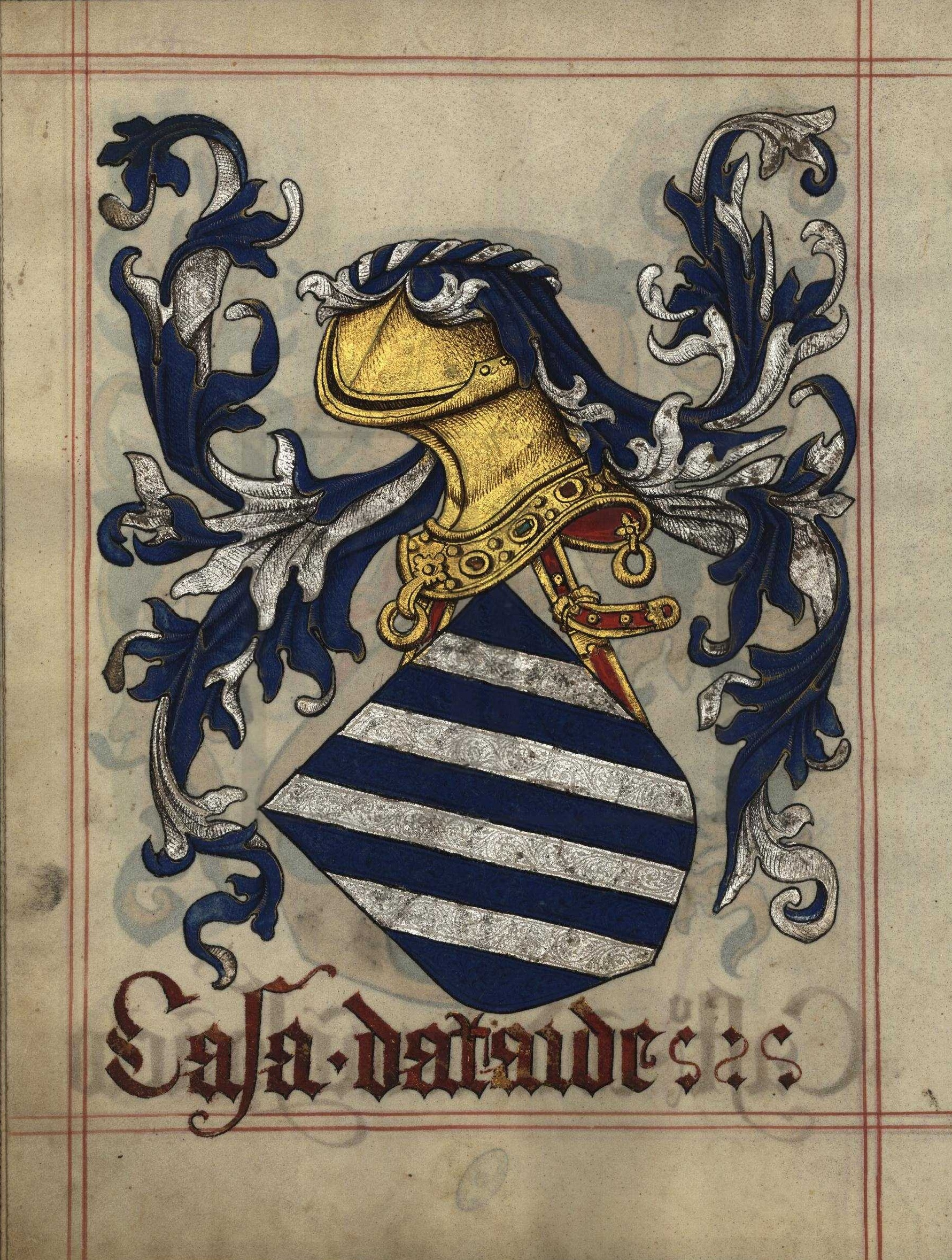
- Arms of the Ataíde family, Counts of Atouguia, in the Livro do Armeiro-Mor (1509)
- Creation date: 17 December 1448
- Created by: Afonso V of Portugal
- Peerage: Peerage of Portugal
- First holder: Dom Álvaro Gonçalves de Ataíde
- Present holder: Extinct
- Subsidiary titles: Marquess of Santarém, Count of Alva, Marchioness of Atouguia
- Extinction date: 1759

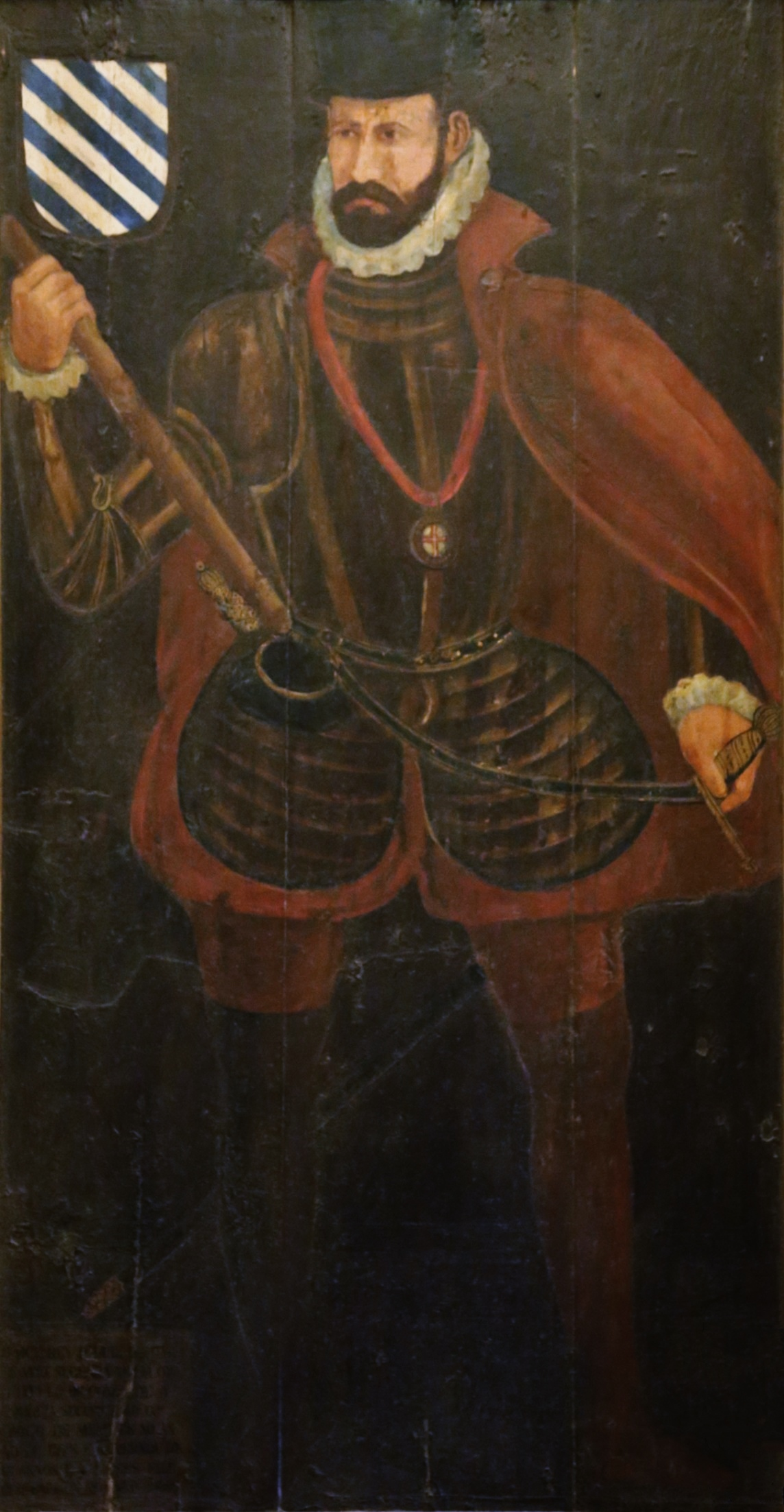
D. Luís de Ataíde, 3rd Count of Atouguia and 1st Marquess of Santarém, Viceroy of Portuguese India in the 16th century

Count of Atouguia (in Portuguese Conde de Atouguia) was a Portuguese title of nobility created by a royal decree, dated from 17 December 1448, by King Afonso V of Portugal, and granted to D. Álvaro Gonçalves de Ataíde.

The title was always associated with the Ataíde family. It became extinct due to the 11th Count's involvement in the Távora affair of 1759. The plot was discovered, the count was executed and his House and estates were confiscated.

== List of counts of Atouguia (1448) ==
1. D. Álvaro Gonçalves de Ataíde (c. 1390 -1452);
2. D. Martinho de Ataíde (c. 1415 - 1499), his son;
3. D. Luís de Ataíde (1516 - 1581), his great-grandson, 10th and 12th Viceroy of India;
4. D. João Gonçalves de Ataíde (c.1560 - ? ), his 2nd cousin;
5. D. Luís de Ataíde (c. 1570 - ? ), his son;
6. D. Jerónimo de Ataíde (c. 1610 - 1665), his son, 21st governor-general of Brazil;
7. D. Manuel Luís de Ataíde (c. 1640 - ? ), his older son;
8. D. Luís Peregrino de Ataíde (c. 1662 - 1689), his younger brother;
9. D. Jerónimo de Ataíde (c. 1680 - 1720), his son;
10. D. Luís Peregrino de Ataíde (1700 - ? ), his son, 6th Viceroy of Brazil;
11. D. Jerónimo de Ataíde (1721 - 1759), his son.

== Family name ==
The family name associated with the Counts of Atouguia was Ataíde.

The origin of the Ataídes can be traced documentally to Egas Duer, a 12th century County of Portugal nobleman, likely a member of the medieval House of Ribadouro, whose son Martim Viegas was the 1st Lord of the Honra and Torre de Ataíde, near present-day Amarante in Northern Portugal.

Martim Viegas' grandson, Gonçalo Viegas de Ataíde, had the lordship of the honra de Ataíde confirmed by King Dinis I, in the year 1290.

The 1st Count of Atouguia, D. Álvaro Gonçalves de Ataíde, was Gonçalo Viegas' great-great-grandson.

== See also ==
- List of countships in Portugal

== Bibliography ==
- Braamcamp Freire, Anselmo, "Brasões da Sala de Sintra", Livro Primeiro, Chapter IV, Coimbra, Imprensa da Universidade, 1921
- Vila-Santa, Nuno, "A Casa de Atouguia, os Últimos Avis e o Império: Dinâmicas entrecruzadas na carreira de D. Luís de Ataíde (1516-1581)", PhD thesis, Lisbon, FCSH-UNL, 2013.
- Vila-Santa, Nuno, “Uma linhagem, Duas Casas: em torno dos Ataídes e das origens das Casas da Atouguia e da Castanheira (Séculos XV-XVI)”, Fragmenta Historica, nº 4, 2016, pp. 13-45.
- "Nobreza de Portugal e do Brasil" – Vol. II, pages 331/337. Published by Zairol Lda., Lisbon 1989.
