= Captaincy of São Paulo and Minas de Ouro =

Former territorial division of Brazil

Captaincy of São Paulo and Minas de Ouro Capitania de São Paulo e Minas de Ouro
- 1709–1720
- Flag of Portugal (1707–1716) Coat of arms

- Approximate extent of the Captaincy of São Vicente in 1709, shortly before the creation of the Captaincy of São Paulo and Minas de Ouro
- Status: Captaincy of the Portuguese Empire
- Capital: São Paulo
- Common languages: Portuguese
- Religion: Catholicism
- Government: Absolute monarchy
- Monarch
- Governor and captain-general
- Historical era: Colonial Brazil
  - War of the Emboabas: 3 November 1709
  - Vila Rica Revolt: 2 December 1720
- Currency: Réis
Preceded by	Succeeded by
Captaincy of São Vicente; Captaincy of Paranaguá	Captaincy of São Paulo; Captaincy of Minas Gerais
- Today part of: Brazil

The Captaincy of São Paulo e Minas de Ouro ("Saint Paul and Gold Mines") was a captaincy of colonial Brazil, created in 1709 by the Portuguese Crown in the aftermath of the War of the Emboabas. It was formed through the purchase of the Captaincy of São Vicente and the Captaincy of Paranaguá from their donataries and the incorporation of parts of the Captaincy of Itanhaém. The new royal captaincy was designed to strengthen royal control over the rich goldfields that had recently been discovered in the hinterland of southeastern Brazil.

With its capital in the town of São Paulo, the captaincy existed for just over a decade. At its greatest extent, it encompassed most of the territory of present-day São Paulo, Paraná, and Santa Catarina to the south, and wide interior areas that would later become Minas Gerais, Goiás, Tocantins, Mato Grosso do Sul, Mato Grosso and parts of Rondônia. In 1720, following the Vila Rica Revolt, the Crown dismembered the captaincy, creating the separate Captaincy of Minas Gerais and re-designating the remainder as the Captaincy of São Paulo.

The article below is based on a translated and restructured version of the corresponding entry in the Portuguese-language Wikipedia, supplemented with material from specialist historiography on the political and territorial formation of colonial São Paulo and Minas Gerais.

== Background and creation ==
In the late seventeenth and early eighteenth centuries, expeditions launched from the Captaincy of São Vicente and the Captaincy of Itanhaém by bandeirante explorers led to the discovery of important alluvial gold deposits in the interior of southeastern Brazil, in what would come to be known as the mining region of Minas Gerais. The news of these discoveries triggered a large-scale gold rush, attracting thousands of colonists born in Portugal (reinóis) as well as settlers from other parts of Portuguese America.

The original discoverers from São Vicente and Itanhaém, later collectively known as paulistas, claimed priority rights over the mines. They came into conflict with the outsiders, whom they pejoratively called emboabas—a term from the língua geral paulista often glossed as “foreigner” or “intruder”. Competition for mining claims, disputes over access to supplies and routes, and the broader question of royal authority in the region culminated in an armed struggle between paulistas and emboabas, remembered as the War of the Emboabas (1707–1709). Although both sides claimed to act in the king's name, the conflict ultimately ended with the assertion of direct royal authority over the mining zone.

On 3 November 1709, as a direct consequence of the war and in order to consolidate metropolitan control over the goldfields, the Crown purchased the donatary rights to the Captaincy of São Vicente and the Captaincy of Paranaguá and merged them into a new royal captaincy called São Paulo e Minas de Ouro. Portions of the neighbouring Captaincy of Itanhaém were also absorbed. The new captaincy was placed under governors and captains-general appointed directly from Lisbon, signalling a shift from semi-autonomous donatary rule to tighter royal oversight.

== Territorial division ==
By the time of its dissolution in 1720, the Captaincy of São Paulo and Minas de Ouro was administratively divided into comarcas (judicial districts), each grouping a number of towns and villages (vilas). Historians generally identify the following main nuclei of settlement, organised here by comarca and approximate date of elevation to the status of vila:

- Comarca of Rio das Mortes
  - Vila de São João del-Rei (1713)
  - Vila de São José del-Rei (1718)
- Comarca of Rio das Velhas
  - Vila de Nossa Senhora da Conceição do Sabará (1711)
  - Vila do Príncipe (1714)
  - Vila Nova da Rainha do Caeté (1714)
  - Vila de Piedade do Pitangui (1715)
- Comarca of São Paulo
  - Vila de São Vicente (1532)
  - Vila de Santos (1546)
  - Town of São Paulo (1553; elevated to city status in 1711)
  - Vila de Nossa Senhora da Conceição de Itanhaém (1561)
  - Vila de Nossa Senhora das Neves de Iguape (1577)
  - Vila de São João Batista de Cananéia (c. 1600)
  - Vila de Santana de Mogi das Cruzes (1611)
  - Vila de Santana de Parnaíba (1625)
  - Vila de São Sebastião (1636)
  - Vila Nova da Exaltação da Santa Cruz do Salvador de Ubatuba (1637)
  - Vila de São Francisco das Chagas de Taubaté (1645)
  - Vila de Nossa Senhora do Rosário de Paranaguá (1648/1649)
  - Vila de Santo Antônio de Guaratinguetá (1651)
  - Vila de Nossa Senhora da Conceição do Rio Paraíba (1653)
  - Vila de Nossa Senhora do Desterro do Mato Grosso de Jundiaí (1655)
  - Vila de Nossa Senhora da Candelária do Utu Guaçu (1657)
  - Vila de Nossa Senhora da Ponte de Sorocaba (1661)
  - Vila de Nossa Senhora da Luz dos Pinhais de Curitiba (1693)
  - Vila de Nossa Senhora do Bom Sucesso de Pindamonhangaba (1705)
- Comarca of Vila Rica
  - Vila do Ribeirão do Carmo, later Vila Real de Nossa Senhora do Carmo (1711)
  - Vila Rica do Ouro Preto (1711)

This network of inland towns and mining camps reflected both the earlier coastal colonisation of São Vicente and the explosive growth of the mining region in the early eighteenth century. Many of these vilas would later become key urban centres in the provinces of São Paulo and Minas Gerais.

== Governors-general ==
The Captaincy of São Paulo and Minas de Ouro was governed by captains-general appointed by the Portuguese Crown. Only three governors held the office during its brief existence:

No.	Portrait	Name	Term of office	Monarch	Notes
1	—	Antônio de Albuquerque Coelho de Carvalho	18 June 1710 – 31 August 1713	John V	First royal governor of the captaincy; oversaw the transition from donatary rule and the initial consolidation of royal authority in the mining zone.
2	—	Brás Baltasar da Silveira	31 August 1713 – 14 September 1717	John V	Continued royal policies of control over mining revenues and the gold trade; his administration coincided with growing tensions that would later erupt in the Vila Rica Revolt.
3		Pedro Miguel de Almeida Portugal e Vasconcelos, 3rd Count of Assumar	14 September 1717 – 2 December 1720	John V	Last governor of the captaincy; led the royal repression of the Vila Rica Revolt and presided over the administrative separation of Minas Gerais from São Paulo.

== Extent and boundaries ==
Thanks largely to the activities of the bandeirantes, the Captaincy of São Paulo and Minas de Ouro covered a vast and porous frontier. To the south it extended over most of what are now the states of São Paulo, Paraná and Santa Catarina. To the west and northwest, its nominal jurisdiction reached deep into the interior, encompassing territories that would later become Minas Gerais, Goiás, Tocantins, Mato Grosso do Sul, Mato Grosso and parts of Rondônia.

In theory, the western boundary of the captaincy—and of Portuguese America itself—remained defined by the meridian established in the Treaty of Tordesillas (1494). In practice, during the period of the Iberian Union and afterwards, Portuguese expansion pushed far beyond that line. By the late seventeenth century, bandeirante expeditions had reached the basins of the Paraná and Paraguay and the highlands leading toward the Andes. In 1680 the Crown founded the Colônia do Sacramento on the left bank of the Río de la Plata, facing Buenos Aires, to secure trade with the platine basin and the Andean region, inaugurating a protracted period of Luso-Spanish disputes that would later be settled in part by the Treaty of Madrid (1750).

The creation of the Captaincy of São Paulo and Minas de Ouro did not immediately clarify all these frontier questions. Rather, it provided a new administrative framework through which the Crown attempted to regulate the occupation of an interior that was still only partially mapped and contested both by Indigenous peoples and by rival colonial powers.

== Partition ==
In 1720, growing tensions in the mining region over royal taxation—particularly the enforcement of the royal fifth (quinto) on gold production and the planned creation of royal foundries—erupted into the Vila Rica Revolt (Sedição de Vila Rica or Revolta de Filipe dos Santos). The uprising centred on Vila Rica and was suppressed with severity by the governor Pedro Miguel de Almeida Portugal e Vasconcelos, Count of Assumar, who ordered the summary execution of the popular leader Filipe dos Santos and the destruction of parts of the town.

In the same year, King John V of Portugal decided to reorganise the administration of the mining region. By royal decree of 2 December 1720 he separated the mining districts from the Captaincy of São Paulo and Minas de Ouro, creating the new Captaincy of Minas Gerais and redefining the boundaries of what would henceforth be known simply as the Captaincy of São Paulo.

The new Captaincy of Minas Gerais initially comprised the mining comarcas of Rio das Velhas, Rio das Mortes and Vila Rica. A fourth comarca, Serro Frio, with its seat in the town of Vila do Príncipe, was created shortly afterwards to administer the northern mining area. The Captaincy of São Paulo retained much of the older coastal and interior territory and would itself undergo further territorial changes over the course of the eighteenth century.

The dissolution of the Captaincy of São Paulo and Minas de Ouro thus marked both the end of an administrative experiment and the beginning of a new phase in the Crown's management of the Brazilian gold economy, characterised by more direct royal oversight and a clearer institutional separation between the mining and non-mining regions of colonial Brazil.

== See also ==
- Captaincies of Brazil
- Captaincy of Minas Gerais
- Captaincy of São Paulo
- Minas Gerais
- War of the Emboabas
- Vila Rica Revolt
- Estrada Real
