= War of the Emboabas =

Early 18th-century conflict in colonial Brazil

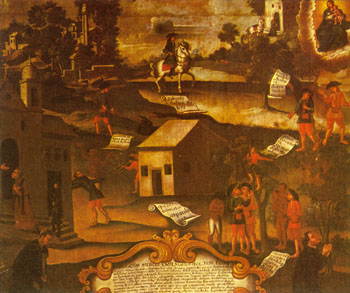
- Ex-voto depicting the trajectory of Agostinho Pereira da Silva, from his departure from Portugal and involvement in conflicts linked to the War of the Emboabas, to his ordination in Bahia; Church and Monastery of Our Lady of Monte Serrat, Salvador
| Date | 1707–1709 |
| Location | Mining region of the former Captaincy of São Vicente and Captaincy of Itanhaém, in what is now Minas Gerais, Brazil |
| Result | Defeat of the paulistas: Creation of the Captaincy of São Paulo and Minas de Ouro; Consolidation of royal control over the mining region |

Belligerents
| Paulistas from the captaincies of São Vicente and Itanhaém | Emboabas from the Kingdom of Portugal (reinóis) and from other Portuguese American captaincies |

Commanders and leaders
| Manuel de Borba Gato | Manuel Nunes Viana |

The War of the Emboabas (Guerra dos Emboabas, lit. “war of the newcomers”) was an internal conflict in colonial Brazil fought between 1707 and 1709 over control of newly discovered gold fields in the interior of the Captaincy of São Vicente. It opposed, on one side, paulista bandeirantes—who had pioneered the exploration of the region and claimed priority or even exclusivity in exploiting the deposits—and, on the other, a heterogeneous group of outsiders from other Brazilian captaincies and from Portugal, pejoratively called emboabas.

The war unfolded in several mining districts of what would later become Minas Gerais, such as Sabará, Cachoeira do Campo and the Arraial Novo do Rio das Mortes. Among the paulistas, one of the main leaders was the former bandeirante Manuel de Borba Gato. The emboabas coalesced around figures such as the baiano landowner and miner Manuel Nunes Viana. The conflict ended with the victory of the newcomers and a decisive intervention by the Portuguese Crown, which reorganised the administration of the mining region and curtailed paulista predominance.

Traditionally interpreted as a regional civil war between “old settlers” and “newcomers”, the War of the Emboabas has attracted renewed historiographical interest as an episode that illuminates the formation of colonial elites, disputes over royal authority and the emergence of distinct regional identities in Portuguese America.

== Etymology ==
The word emboaba is widely understood to have originated in the old paulista língua geral and to have carried, from an early date, a pejorative sense of “outsider” or “invader”. Etymologists, however, disagree on its precise derivation.

A long-standing explanation—often attributed to the French traveller Auguste de Saint-Hilaire—links the term to a Tupi expression for birds with feathered legs (mbóab). According to this interpretation, paulistas likened the high boots and gaiters worn by newcomers to the plumage of such birds, in contrast with the custom of many pioneers of walking barefoot or in simple footwear. Modern linguistic studies note that this explanation is largely conjectural and rests more on the traveller’s imagination than on solid knowledge of indigenous languages.

Alternative derivations propose that the word may be a corruption of forms such as amôabá, amô-abá or aba-ambôaé-abá, with meanings along the lines of “different man”, “foreigner” or “man with different hair”, referring to perceived physical differences among Indigenous, European and African populations.

Another hypothesis, considered more consistent by some scholars, traces the term to o-mboábae, associated with the idea of “one who ambushes or betrays”. In this reading, emboaba would have been used by paulistas to designate people from other captaincies and from Portugal whom they perceived as deceitfully usurping the newly discovered gold fields in the interior—hence the possible sense of “traitors” or “invaders”.

Despite the disagreements, all major interpretations agree that the name had a strong negative connotation and was associated with tensions over access to mineral wealth.

== Background ==
=== Discovery of gold and transformation of the colony ===
Gold discoveries in Brazil at the end of the 17th century and the beginning of the 18th triggered profound social, economic and political changes. For decades, paulista bandeirantes based in São Paulo dos Campos de Piratininga had pushed deep into the interior, raiding Indigenous communities for slaves, hunting runaway captives and searching for precious metals. Their expeditions, departing both from the Captaincy of São Vicente and the neighbouring Itanhaém, opened routes across what are now the states of São Paulo, Minas Gerais, Goiás, Mato Grosso and Mato Grosso do Sul.

By the 1690s, alluvial gold was being extracted from streams and riverbeds in the region that contemporaries called Minas dos Matos Gerais, later Minas Gerais. News of the richness of these deposits spread quickly. Within less than two decades, tens of thousands of people—from Portugal, from the captaincies of Bahia, Pernambuco, Rio de Janeiro and from other parts of Portuguese America—migrated towards the interior, together with large contingents of enslaved Indigenous and African workers.

The sudden demographic explosion gave rise to precarious mining camps and new settlements along the valleys of the Rio das Velhas, Carmo and Das Mortes rivers. Observers such as the Jesuit chronicler André João Antonil described an atmosphere of disorder, greed and social upheaval in which food, tools and basic goods reached exorbitant prices owing to shortages and the difficulty of supplying the interior.

=== Paulistas and newcomers ===
The paulistas claimed priority over the mines on the grounds that they had discovered and first exploited the deposits and that they had rendered important military services to the Crown in campaigns such as the suppression of the Palmares quilombo and the Cariris uprisings. In 1700, the municipal council of São Paulo petitioned for exclusive control of the mining region, but the request was denied, reinforcing the feeling among paulista elites that their interests were being neglected by Lisbon.

The outsiders, or emboabas, formed an extremely diverse group that included Portuguese merchants and officials, cattle drovers and farmers from Bahia and Pernambuco, small miners from Rio de Janeiro and adventurers from elsewhere in the colony. They generally enjoyed closer ties to coastal trade networks and to royal authorities, and many resented what they perceived as paulista monopolies over the best claims and over local offices and contracts.

Both sides thus accused each other of abuse and usurpation. For the paulistas, those who had not taken part in the arduous process of exploration should not enjoy the same rights in the distribution of mineral wealth. For the emboabas, the paulistas behaved as a closed, violent oligarchy that tried to exclude newcomers from opportunities in the mining frontier.

=== Royal interests and rising tensions ===
The Crown had a central stake in the region because of the quinto tax, a royal claim to a fifth of all gold extracted. Officials were instructed to prevent smuggling, regulate the marking of claims and ensure the shipment of the royal share to Lisbon. At the same time, the absence of a stable administrative framework in the mines and the distance from coastal centres hampered effective control.

From 1706 onward, quarrels over plots of land, watercourses and access to supply contracts multiplied. Attempts by local authorities to impose monopolies on butcher shops and cattle routes—often granted to allies—exacerbated popular discontent. Violence escalated in several districts, and rumours of conspiracies and impending massacres spread through the camps.

In 1707, two leading paulistas were lynched by emboabas at the Arraial Novo do Rio das Mortes (later São João del-Rei), an episode frequently cited as a turning point. That same year, clashes intensified in Sabará and Cachoeira do Campo. By late 1707, the region was effectively divided into two rival political camps, each demanding that the Crown confirm its preferred order in the mines.

== Course of the war ==
=== Outbreak and main theatres ===
Open warfare broke out between 1707 and 1708, with successive skirmishes and reprisals in different mining centres. In the Sabará district, conflicts involved groups aligned with Borba Gato and migrants from Bahia and Pernambuco over the control of claims along the Rio das Velhas.

In Cachoeira do Campo, disputes over mines and routes to the coast culminated in battles that preceded one of the most famous episodes of the war, the so-called Capão da Traição (“Thicket of Treason”). In the Rio das Mortes region, the lynching of paulista chiefs in 1707 deepened mistrust and spurred the mobilisation of militias and armed bands on both sides.

Reports from the period describe hundreds of armed men moving between camps, the expulsion of rivals from particular districts and the systematic disarming of paulistas by emboaba groups, who claimed to be acting preventively against a supposed paulista conspiracy to annihilate them.

=== Capão da Traição ===
The best-known episode of the War of the Emboabas is the massacre remembered as the Capão da Traição (“Thicket of Treason”). After suffering defeats near Cachoeira do Campo, a group of paulistas retreated to a small patch of dense woodland between what is now Prados and São João del-Rei and took up a defensive position there.

According to traditional accounts, emboaba forces led by Bento do Amaral Coutinho surrounded the thicket. After an exchange of fire and a siege lasting roughly two days, the paulistas, short of ammunition and isolated, agreed to lay down their arms in exchange for guarantees of safety. The subsequent killing of many or most of the prisoners—reportedly numbering in the hundreds—was later remembered by paulista chroniclers as an act of treachery that gave the battle its name.

Modern historians have questioned the exact number of victims and some details of the narrative, pointing out that 19th-century authors often exaggerated the scale of the massacre for patriotic or regionalist purposes. Nevertheless, the episode clearly marked the collapse of paulista military resistance in the central mining districts and became a powerful symbol in later memories of the war.

=== Proclamation of Nunes Viana and royal intervention ===
After gaining the upper hand in several districts, the emboabas convened assemblies and proclaimed Manuel Nunes Viana ‘‘governor of the mines’’, effectively establishing a parallel authority in the region and directly challenging royal prerogatives.

Alarmed by reports of continuing unrest and by the risk to royal revenues, the Crown ordered the governor of the Captaincy of Rio de Janeiro, Antônio de Albuquerque Coelho de Carvalho, to march to the mines and restore order. Despite previous instructions that governors should not leave their seats without explicit authorisation, a junta convened in Rio de Janeiro in January 1709 concluded that the gravity of the situation justified an exception.

Arriving in the mining region early in 1709, Albuquerque Coelho de Carvalho deposed Nunes Viana, dissolved his administration and reasserted royal control over the distribution of claims, policing and tax collection. Without external support, militarily exhausted and politically isolated, the paulistas abandoned their remaining positions and withdrew from the region. Many migrated westwards, taking part in new waves of exploration in what would become Goiás, Mato Grosso and Mato Grosso do Sul.

By the end of 1709, open hostilities had ceased, though underlying tensions in the mining society would reappear in later conflicts such as the Vila Rica Revolt of 1720.

== Primary accounts ==
Although surviving documentation is fragmentary and often partisan, several contemporary narratives have shaped historical understanding of the War of the Emboabas.

One of the earliest is the Notícia dos primeiros descobridores das primeiras minas de ouro pertencentes a estas Minas Gerais, attributed to Bento Furtado Fernandes de Mendonça, son of the bandeirante Salvador Fernandes Furtado. Written in the mid-18th century, it presents a strongly paulista perspective, praising the “famous discoverers” and condemning the “ungrateful sons of Europe” who allegedly tried to appropriate the fruits of paulista labour through contracts and monopolies.

Letters by Borba Gato to the governor Fernando Martins Mascarenhas de Lencastre, written in 1708 from the Rio das Velhas district, describe the presence of armed emboaba bands, the difficulty of enforcing royal fiscal rules and the circulation of “passwords” and signals for uprisings in the mining camps.

On the emboaba side, a detailed letter by Bento do Amaral Coutinho, dated January 1709 and sent from Ouro Preto, portrays the paulistas as aggressors plotting night attacks on the main settlements and justifies the mobilisation of thousands of armed men as a defensive necessity. It provides information on early clashes in Caeté and Sabará, on the disarming of paulistas and on the political organisation of the emboaba militia.

Historians have used these texts not only as factual sources but also as evidence of how different groups constructed their political identities and memories in the aftermath of the conflict.

== Consequences ==
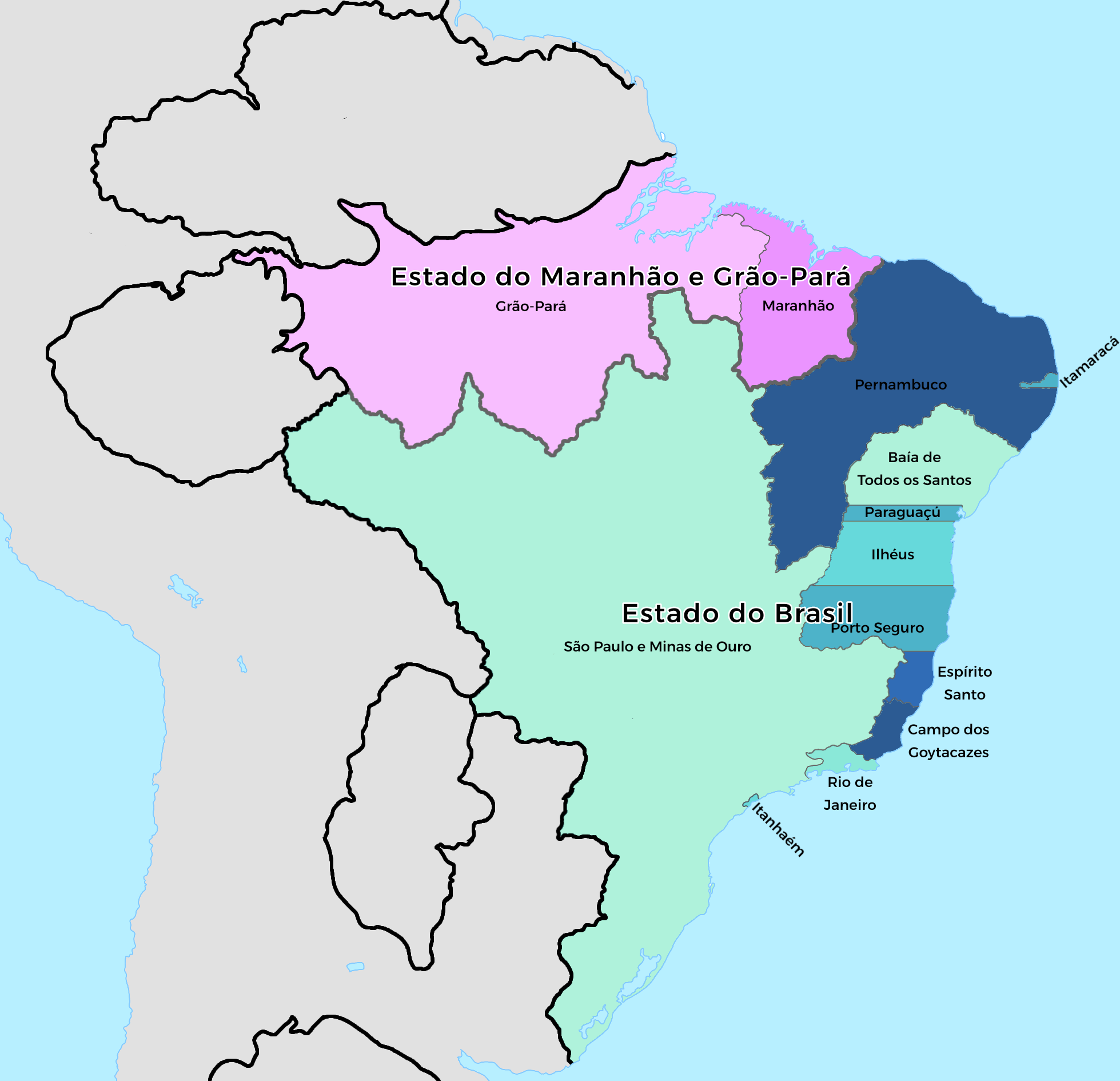
Map of Brazil in 1709, showing the captaincies after the war

The War of the Emboabas had far-reaching consequences for the territorial organisation of Portuguese America, for the balance of power among colonial elites and for the configuration of royal authority in the mining region.

In administrative terms, the main outcomes were:

- the regulation and intensification of the quinto tax and of other mechanisms for supervising gold production;
- the formal regulation of the distribution of mines between paulistas and emboabas;
- the royal decision, on 3 November 1709, to break up the old Captaincy of São Vicente and create the Captaincy of São Paulo and Minas de Ouro and a separate Captaincy of Rio de Janeiro, both directly subordinated to the Crown;
- the elevation of São Paulo to the status of city and its designation as the capital of the new captaincy;
- the subsequent creation of the mining towns of Vila Rica (1711), Sabará (1711) and São João del-Rei (1713), which structured the emerging urban network of Minas Gerais.

Socially and demographically, the defeat of the paulistas led to the westward movement of many of their leaders and followers, who, over the following decades, were involved in opening new mining and frontier zones in the centre-west of the colony. At the same time, emboaba merchants, contractors and local office-holders consolidated their positions in the central mining districts, contributing to the rise of new regional elites often more closely tied to Lisbon and to coastal trading houses.

Economically, the imposition of tighter royal control over the mines and the establishment of more stable political conditions favoured an increase in gold output over the first half of the 18th century. Minas Gerais became the richest region in Brazil, with production peaking around the mid-century, although contraband and clandestine routes—especially along the São Francisco River—diverted a significant portion of the metal from official channels.

In broader historical perspective, scholars have highlighted several longer-term consequences of the war:

- a redefinition of the relationship between the Crown and colonial society, marked by stronger centralisation and closer supervision of key economic regions;
- the acceleration of a process of regional differentiation between “paulistas” and the emerging identity of “mineiros”, which would later play a role in political struggles in the 18th and 19th centuries;
- the consolidation of patterns of inequality and social exclusion in the mining society, where access to offices, contracts and profitable claims was increasingly concentrated in the hands of a relatively small group of royal appointees, great merchants and large slave-owners.

== Historiography and memory ==
For much of the 19th and early 20th centuries, the War of the Emboabas was narrated primarily through paulista-centred chronicles and regional histories, which portrayed the conflict as a struggle between heroic pioneers and greedy outsiders. Authors such as Afonso d'Escragnolle Taunay and Diogo de Vasconcelos contributed to the consolidation of this patriotic image.

From the second half of the 20th century onwards, studies by Charles R. Boxer, Kenneth Maxwell, Laura de Mello e Souza, João Pinto Furtado, Adriana Romeiro and others reinterpreted the episode in the light of social history, political culture and imperial administration, emphasising the complexity of the interests at stake and the role of the Crown in arbitrating disputes among colonial elites.

Recent works have also explored the conflict’s impact on Indigenous and African populations, who formed the majority of the workforce in the mines but rarely appear as protagonists in traditional narratives, as well as its connections with wider patterns of rebellion and negotiation in the Portuguese Empire.

== In literature and popular culture ==
The War of the Emboabas has had a lasting presence in Brazilian cultural production. The best-known fictional treatment is the novel A Muralha (1954) by Diná Silveira de Queirós, which dramatizes the expansion of the bandeirantes and the violence of conflicts between paulistas and outsiders in the context of gold discoveries in the interior. The story was adapted for television in the telenovela A Muralha (1968) and in a 2000 miniseries, further popularising images associated with the war.

The conflict is also frequently referenced in local commemorations, museum exhibitions and regional historiography in Minas Gerais and São Paulo, where it serves as a key symbol in narratives about the colonial origins of each region.

== See also ==
- Bandeirantes
- Gold cycle
- Captaincy of São Paulo and Minas de Ouro
  - Captaincy of São Vicente
  - Captaincy of Itanhaém
- History of Minas Gerais
- War of the Mascates
