= Captaincy of Santo Amaro =

Captaincy of Santo Amaro Capitania de Santo Amaro
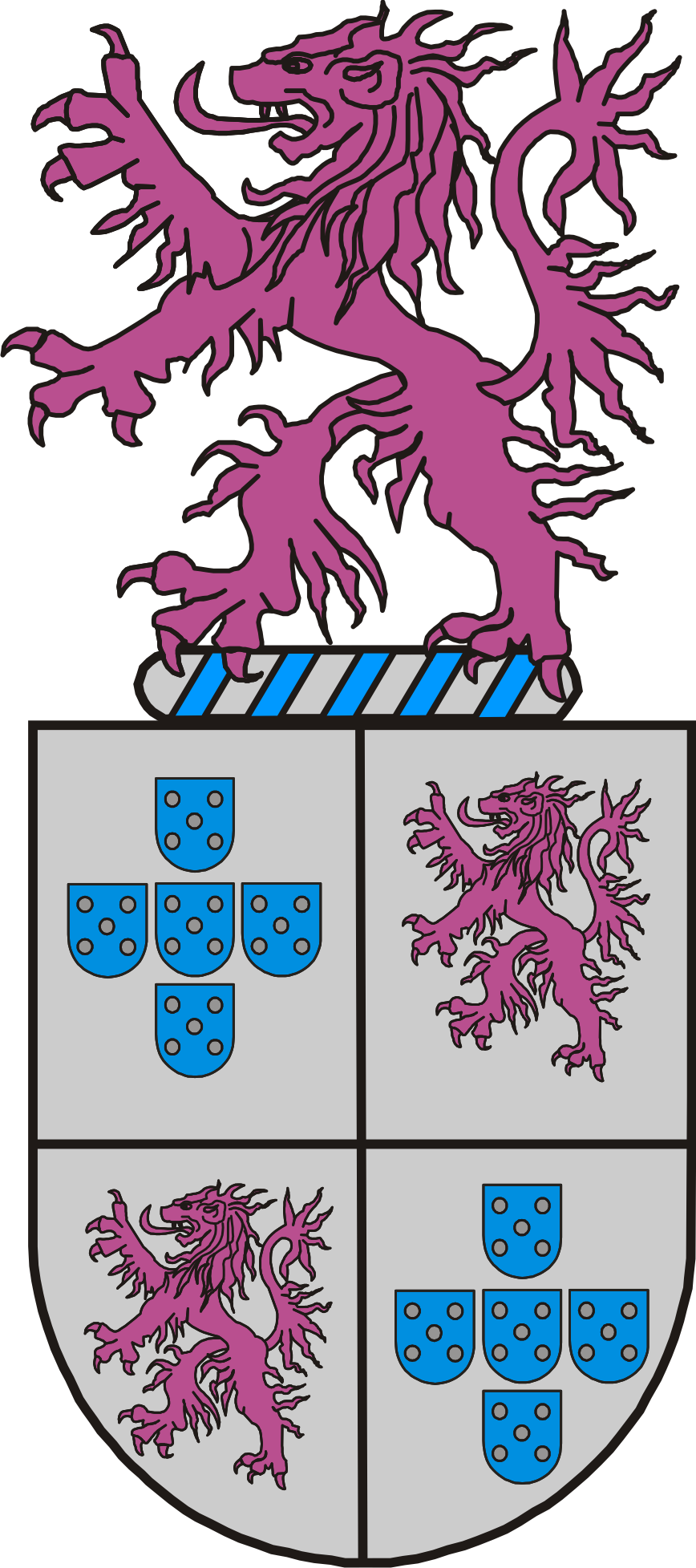
- Flag Coat of arms
- Status: Dependent territory
- Other languages: Portuguese and General Language
- Religion: Roman Catholicism
- Government: Absolute monarchy
  - 1534 - ?: Pero Lopes de Sousa (first)
  - ? - 1623: Álvares Pires de Castro (last)
- History
  - Established: 1534
  - Disestablished: 1623
| Preceded by | Succeeded by |
| Tupiniquim | Captaincy of São Vicente |
- Today part of: Brazil

The Captaincy of Santo Amaro was one of the subdivisions established by the Portuguese administration in Colonial Brazil. It was created in 1534 as part of a new law that founded 14 new hereditary regions in Portuguese America, which were granted by the King Dom João III to Portuguese noblemen. Santo Amaro was granted to Pero Lopes de Sousa, with settlements being initially established in the mouth of the Juqueriquerê river, in Caraguatatuba.

== History ==
The lack of commercially valuable natural resources and connections by road to the São Paulo highlands hindered the development of the captaincy. The only actions taken by the Portuguese crown to occupy the new territory were some conversion missions by Jesuit priests in indigenous settlements and the construction of the São João and São Felipe forts, which were built with the objective of protecting the port of Santos.

With time, Santo Amaro became de facto part of the larger and more developed captaincy of São Vicente, which entered a personal union with Santo Amaro in the 1620s, as it was awarded to the Count of Monsanto after a legal dispute with the Countess of Vimieiro. Some historians claim that São Vicente and Pernambuco were the only captaincies of Brazil that truly prospered during the colonial period.

== List of donatários ==
- Pero Lopes de Sousa
- Pedro Lopes
- Martim Afonso de Sousa
- D. Jerônima de Albuquerque e Sousa
- D. Isabel de Lima de Sousa Miranda
- Lopo de Sousa
- Luís de Castro, Count of Monsanto
- D. Álvaro Pires de Castro
