= Captaincy of Rio de Janeiro =

Former territorial division of Brazil

Royal Captaincy of Rio de Janeiro Capitania Real do Rio de Janeiro
- 1567–1821
- Flag of the United Kingdom of Portugal, Brazil, and the Algarves Coat of arms of the United Kingdom of Portugal, Brazil and the Algarves

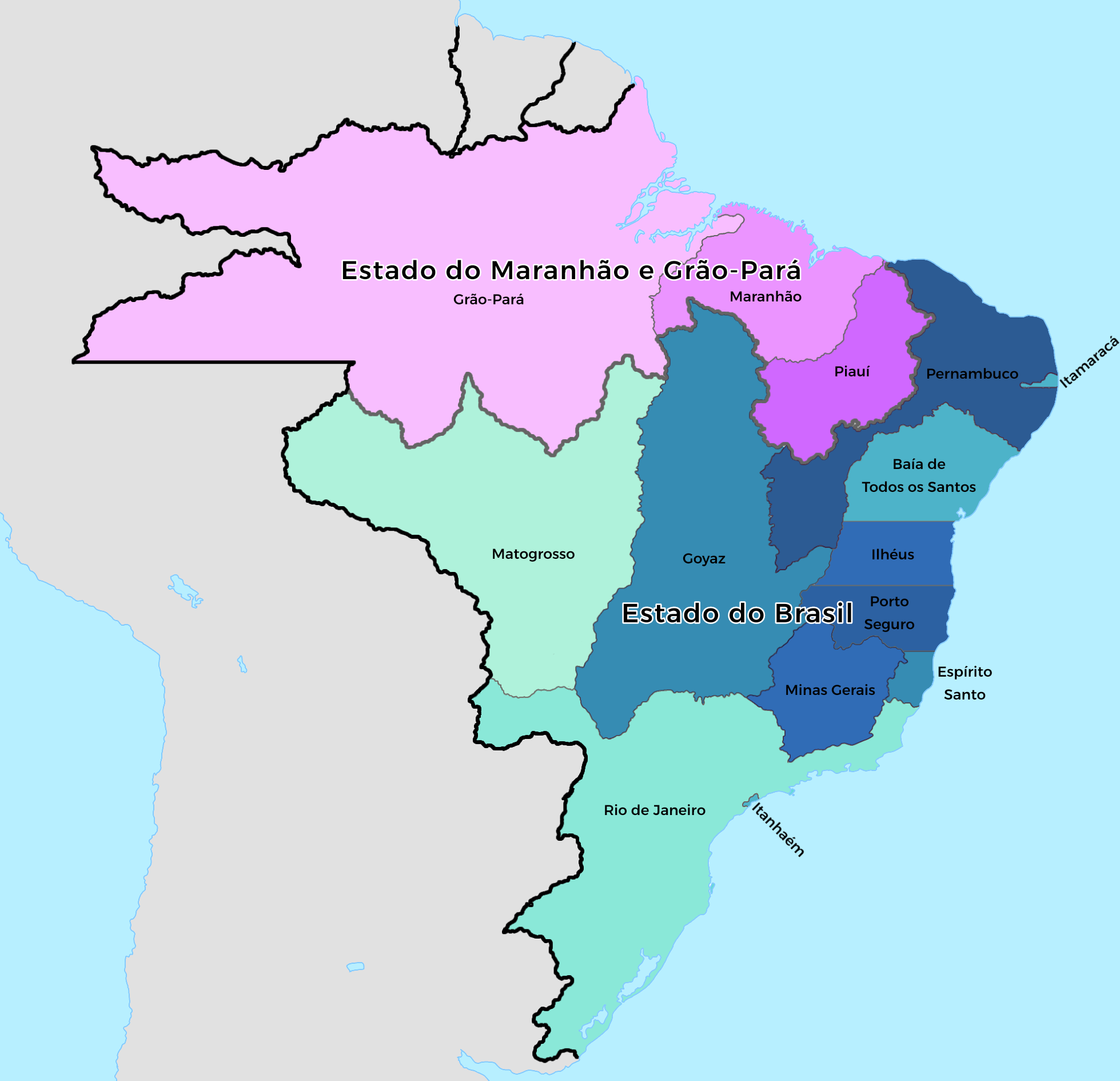
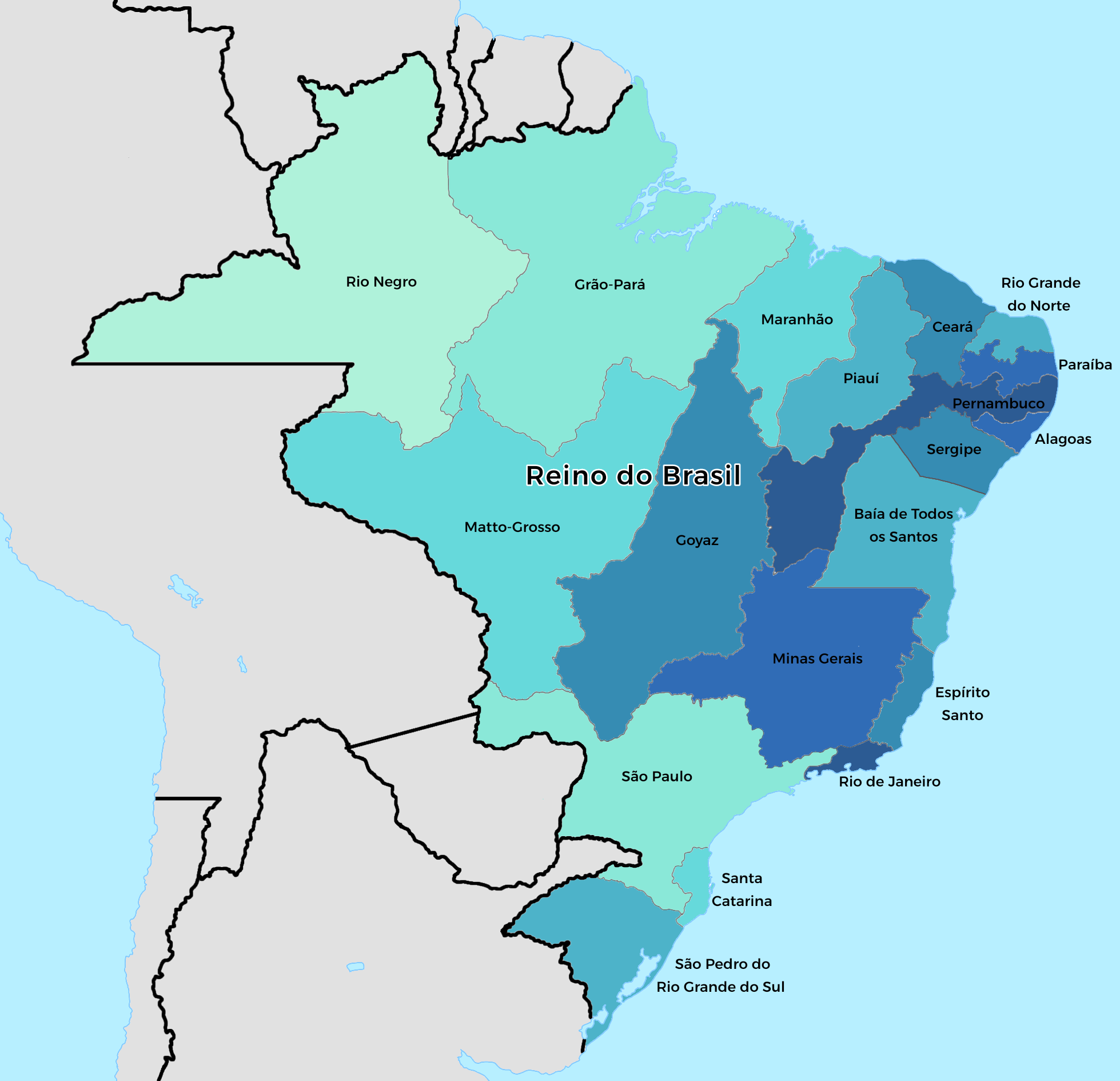
- Status: Dependent territory
- Capital: São Sebastião do Rio de Janeiro
- Official languages: Portuguese
- Religion: Catholicism

Government
  - First grantee: Estácio de Sá; 1565–1567
  - Last grantee: Gomes Freire de Andrade; 1733–1763
  - First Viceroy: Antônio Álvares da Cunha; 1763–1767
  - Last Viceroy: Marcos de Noronha e Brito; 1806–1808
- Legislature: Courts

The Captaincy of Rio de Janeiro was established in the northern portion of the Captaincy of São Vicente, encompassing territory from Macaé (now part of Rio de Janeiro) to Caraguatatuba (now part of São Paulo). This region had been abandoned by its donatário Martim Afonso de Sousa, who, uninterested in its settlement, directed his attention and resources to the area along the current São Paulo coast.

== History ==
=== 16th century ===
Since it was not occupied by the Portuguese, the region of Guanabara Bay experienced an attempt at colonization by the French between 1555 and 1567, known as France Antarctique. In response, Portugal founded the city of São Sebastião do Rio de Janeiro in 1565 and, in 1567, established the Royal Captaincy of Rio de Janeiro, appointing Estácio de Sá as its first representative. He died later that same year. In 1570, the then governor of the Captaincy of Rio de Janeiro, Antônio Salema, assembled an army of Portuguese troops supported by catechized indigenous people to eliminate the French-Tamoio dominance that had persisted for twenty years along the coast. Fearing the loss of their territories, the Tamoios, who remained allied with the French, were largely defeated during the conflict known as the Cabo Frio War, which ended in 1575.

=== 17th century ===
In 1619, the Captaincy of São Tomé was ceded by its donatário and returned to the Portuguese Empire. A significant portion of its territory, extending from the area of the present-day city of Macaé to Itapemirim in Espírito Santo, including the largely unexplored interior, was incorporated into the Captaincy of Rio de Janeiro. In 1674, the Captaincy of Paraíba do Sul, also known as the Captaincy of Campos dos Goytacazes, was established by subdividing the northern part of the Captaincy of Rio de Janeiro. This new captaincy covered a region similar to that previously occupied by the Captaincy of São Tomé. In 1679, after the Restoration of Portugal's Independence from Spain, Governor Manuel Lobo was ordered to establish a colony on the eastern side of the River Plate, which he named Colonia del Santíssimo Sacramento, in an expedition that gathered 400 soldiers recruited in Rio de Janeiro and São Paulo. Four ships were dispatched, loaded with supplies and armed with 18 cannons.

=== 18th century ===
Vuë en pevpective De Riougenaire Ville de la Merrique..., drawing by François Moyen depicting the town of Rio de Janeiro in 1744

In 1720, the towns of Angra dos Reis and Paraty were transferred to the Captaincy of São Paulo and remained until 1727, when they were reincorporated to Rio de Janeiro. In 1738, with the Portuguese expansion to the south, the Captaincy of Santa Catarina was founded in the territory of the Captaincy of São Paulo, which was subordinated to the Captaincy of Rio de Janeiro.

In 1748, Portugal decided that the Captaincy of São Paulo would be subordinated to the Captaincy of Rio de Janeiro, which was then tasked with administering lands up to the coastal region of present-day Rio Grande do Sul. In 1750, through the Treaty of Madrid, the lands of the Misiones Orientales and the Pampas of Rio Grande do Sul were also incorporated into the administration of Rio de Janeiro, in exchange for the Colonia del Sacramento to the Spanish. That same year, the lands of the now-extinct Captaincy of Paraíba do Sul were also incorporated, making the Captaincy of Rio de Janeiro reach its greatest historical extent. In 1753, the Captaincy of Itanhaém was incorporated into Rio de Janeiro, and the area previously belonging to the Captaincy of Paraíba do Sul was reassigned to the Captaincy of Espírito Santo, which remained part of Rio de Janeiro until it was re-established as a separate captaincy in 1832.

In 1760, the Captaincy of Rio Grande de São Pedro was established, remaining subordinate to the Captaincy of Rio de Janeiro. The following year, after the Guaraní War, the captaincy lost the territory of the Misiones Orientales upon signing the Treaty of El Pardo with the Spanish but gained back the Colonia del Sacramento.

In 1763, the Portuguese Empire decided to transfer the capital of the State of Brazil from Salvador to the city of São Sebastião do Rio de Janeiro. This relocation aimed to improve control over the production in the Captaincy of Minas Gerais, whose goods were originally transported through the port of Paraty (Caminho Velho) but were later redirected to the port of Rio de Janeiro (Caminho Novo). Two years later, São Paulo regained its autonomy under the administration of Luís António de Sousa Botelho Mourão, the third Morgado de Mateus, who created several towns in São Paulo territory.

In 1777, Spanish forces occupied the Captaincy of Santa Catarina but returned it the following year after the Treaty of San Ildefonso, which granted them the Pampas region of Rio Grande do Sul and the Colonia del Sacramento. At the end of the year, another treaty will determine the return of the Pampas to the Captaincy of Rio Grande de São Pedro.

=== 19th century ===
In 1804, still subordinated to Rio de Janeiro, the Captaincy of Rio Grande de São Pedro annexed the lands of the Misiones and extended to the Uruguay River. Three years later, it gained autonomy from Rio de Janeiro, taking control of the Captaincy of Santa Catarina and getting the name of Captaincy of São Pedro do Rio Grande do Sul.

On February 28, 1821, by the decision of the Portuguese Empire, the captaincies of the Kingdom of Brazil became provinces; the Province of Rio de Janeiro was established, initially remaining under direct administration by the crown.

During the colonial period, especially when Rio de Janeiro was a captaincy, several towns were founded, in addition to the city of São Sebastião do Rio de Janeiro, which served as its administrative center: Angra dos Santos Reis da Ilha Grande (1608), Santa Helena (later Nossa Senhora da Assunção de Cabo Frio, 1615), Nossa Senhora dos Remédios de Paraty (1667), São Salvador dos Campos (1677), Santo Antônio de Sá (1679), Nossa Senhora da Piedade de Magé (1696), São João do Paraíba (1676), Vila Nova de São José del Rei, São João Marcos (1733), Nossa Senhora da Conceição da Paraíba Nova (1756) and Itaguaí (1818).

== See also ==
- List of governors of Rio de Janeiro
- France Antarctique
