= Vila Rica Revolt =

Rebellion in colonial Minas Gerais, Brazil

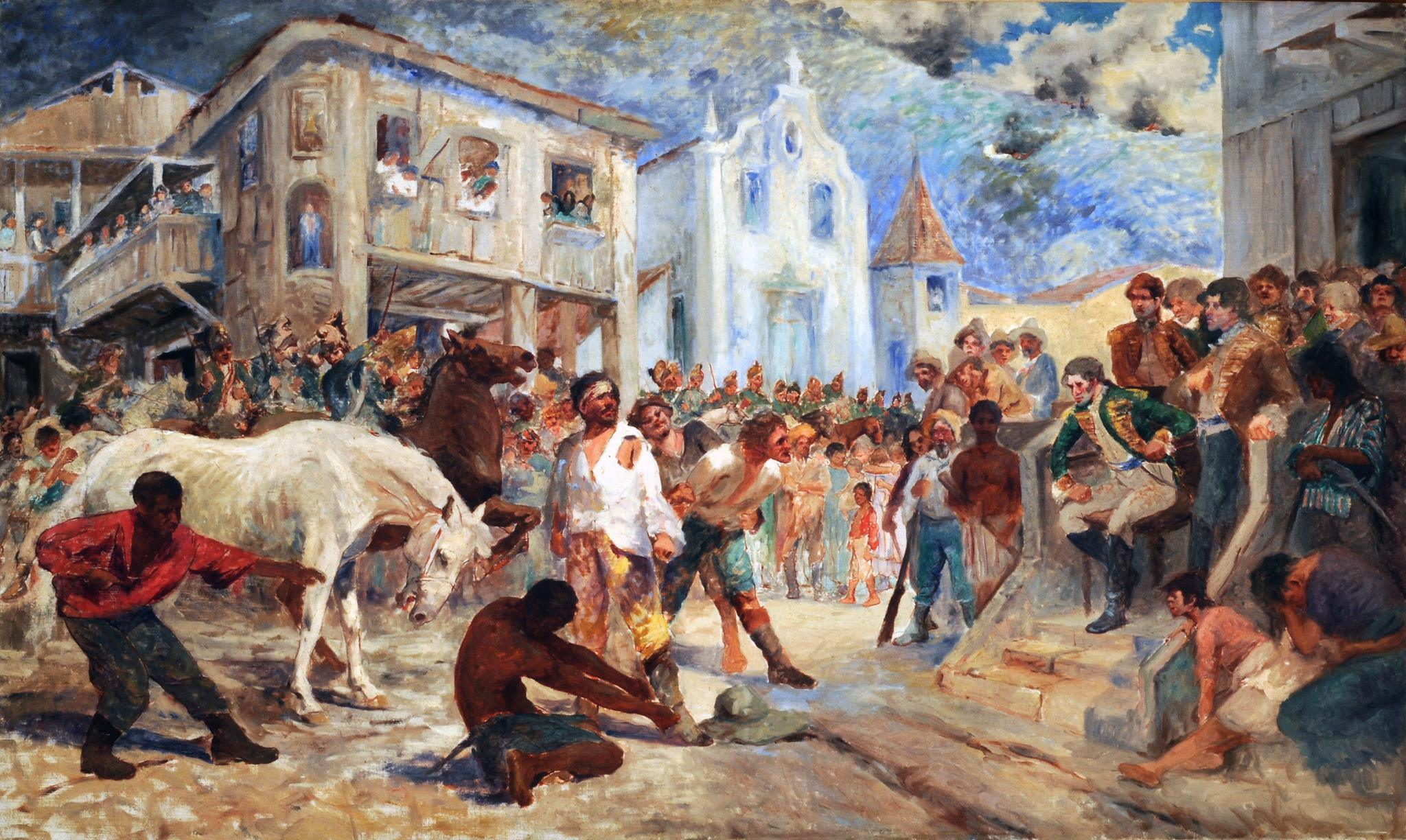
Trial of Filipe dos Santos. Oil by Antônio Parreiras depicting the mythical version of the execution. In the background, the painter shows the smoke from the burning of the houses of the rebels

The Vila Rica Revolt (Portuguese: Revolta de Vila Rica), also known as Vila Rica Sedition, was a colonial revolt against the Portuguese crown. It took place between June 28 and July 19, 1720, in Vila Rica, a city in the Royal Captaincy of Minas de Ouro and Campos Gerais dos Cataguases, in Colonial Brazil. It is traditionally considered a nativist movement by Brazilian historiography, and one of the precursors of the so-called Minas Gerais Conspiracy. Recent reviews show that it was part of a cycle of local contestations that sought to correct errors of the administration. It is also commonly referred to as Filipe dos Santos Revolt, after one of its leaders.

Among its direct causes were the creation of the foundry houses, the prohibition of the circulation of gold dust and the monopoly of the main commodities by reinóis (those born in Portugal). The revolt was met with an energetic reaction from governor Pedro Miguel de Almeida Portugal e Vasconcelos, the Count of Assumar, that culminated with the execution of its main leader, Filipe dos Santos.

== Historical background ==
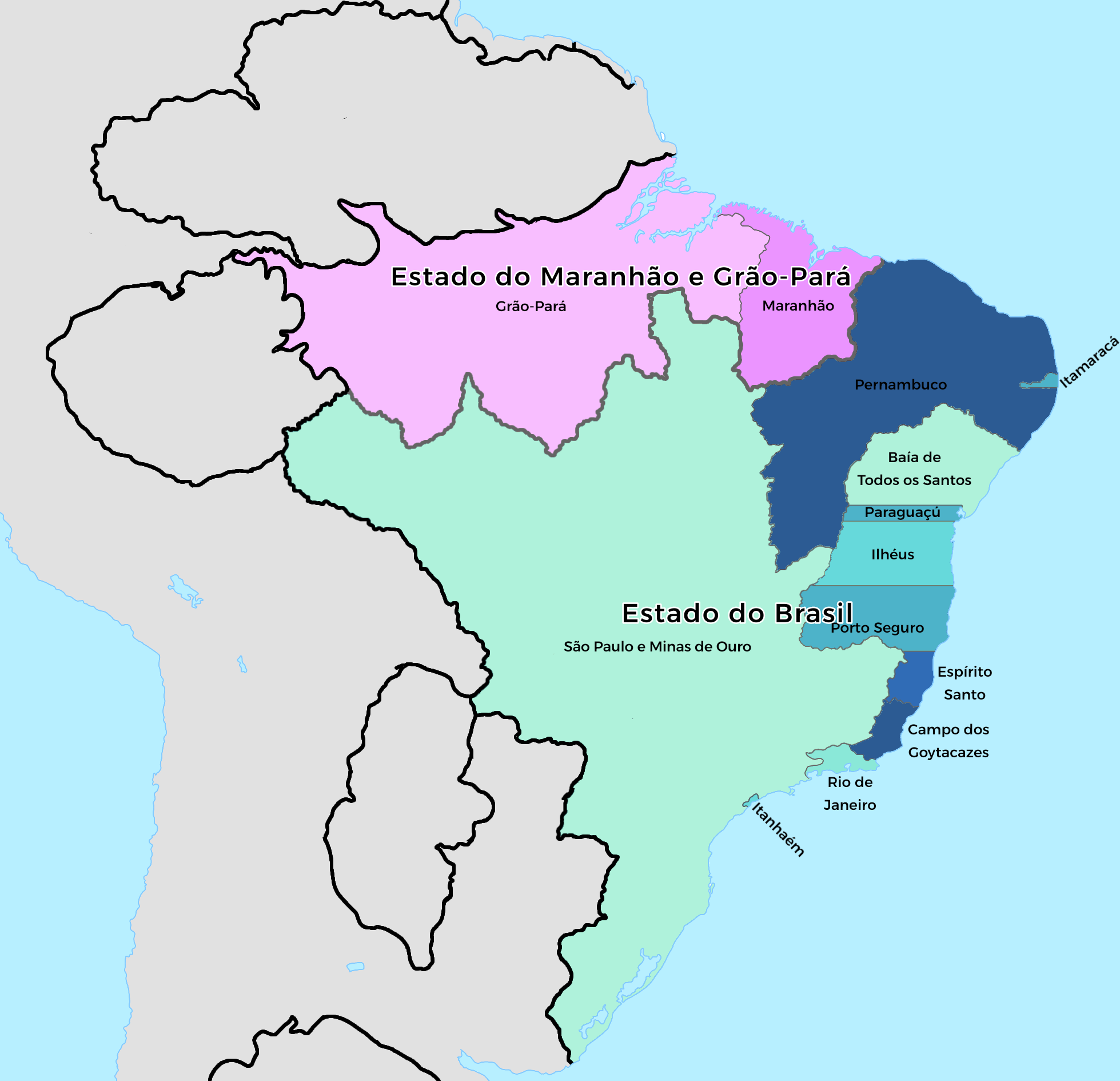
Brazil in 1709

The Minas region (now Minas Gerais state) had already experienced great upheavals that showed, as Pedro Calmon says, a "brave people, vain of their power" in the mountains, aware that the law would only be enforced if its inhabitants agreed. This is how, in the beginning of the 18th century, the War of the Emboabas began, pitting the emboaba Manuel Nunes Viana against D. Fernando de Mascarenhas and the Paulistas, and which resulted in the separation of the Captaincy of São Paulo and Minas de Ouro in 1709.

The laws, in the sertão, were imposed by true "régulos" (as one governor recorded in 1737). The government was distant and lacked strength in these places, unlike the inhabitants - supportive, organized and armed.

The production of the mines grew, while the taxes sent to the royal court remained stagnant. In Portugal, an explanation was demanded; it lay in smuggling, which caused enormous damage to the royal treasury. One of the measures adopted, in 1719, (Note: While Aquino informs that it was a law of 1718, Souto Maior accurately informs that the institution of the fifth resulted from the Royal Charter of February 11, 1719.) was the foundry houses imposition forbidding the circulation of gold dust and demanding that all ore had to be smelted in one of those institutions to be created in Vila Rica, Sabará, São João del-Rei and in Vila do Príncipe. These were the places where the royal fifth would be paid. In this way, the so-called "fifthed gold" would be the only gold that could circulate freely, that is, that would be marked with the Crown's seal, and on which tribute would have been paid.

The previous prevailing situation, which the municipal councils accepted, was that of a specific and fixed amount to be paid at the end of each year. The then governor Dom Brás Baltasar da Silveira insisted on imposing the so-called gold panning tax, which consisted of 12 oitavas of gold from each miner (each oitava equals 3.5859 grams). The councils proposed that they would pay the tax at the royal roads, on the condition that the gold could circulate freely. An insurrection occurred, which resulted in the councils paying the fixed payment of 30 arrobas. This, however, still did not meet the wishes of the Crown. This fixed rate of payment was given the name of "finta". These orders resulted in the Pitangui Revolt, and left the region in a constant state of discontent and imminent upheaval.

The interests of the powerful (among whom was the wealthiest of them, camp-master Pascoal da Silva Guimarães from Vila Rica), were also at stake with the changes intended by the Crown. The leader of the emboabas himself, Manuel Nunes Viana, incited the people against the idea of the royal fifth.

== Preceding facts ==
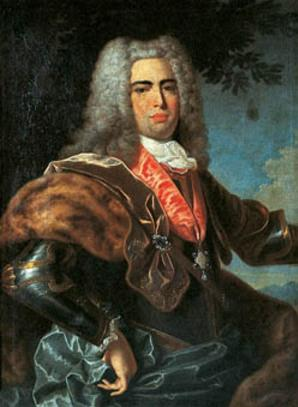
King John V of Portugal (1689-1750)

Against this state of affairs, King John V appointed Pedro Miguel de Almeida Portugal e Vasconcelos, Count of Assumar, as governor. His function included applying, in Minas Gerais, three dispositions that were contrary to local interests:

1. Announcement of the installation, in the captaincy, of a bishopric, aiming at the moralization of the clergy, who, there, lived dissolutely, practicing from small crimes to celibacy violation, besides being involved in gold trafficking;
2. Application of the Royal Charter of April 25, 1720, which extinguished some functions, increased the governor's power, and also brought to Minas a contingent of Dragoons; (Note: Aquino, and also Maior, refer to "Cavalry Dragoons". However, in Portugal, the Dragoons only became part of the cavalry when the military reform of 1742 took place - so we do not follow here what the sources say.)
3. Imposition of compliance with the creation the foundry houses, and which had already caused riots.

Sending the soldiers was a precaution against the exorbitant levy imposed, anticipating the Crown that there would be resistance. The Count of Assumar had already aroused antipathy among the miners, and when the first soldiers arrived in Ribeirão do Carmo, Domingos Rodrigues do Prado was leading, in Pitangui, an agitation against the governor.

The inconvenience that the foundry houses would cause (the forced displacement to them, the expenses with bureaucracy, lodging, delays, etc.) was another difficulty that the people were not willing to tolerate. In this scenario, besides Pitangui, other villages were agitated, and the Dragoons ended up using violent repression. Nevertheless, the crisis had spread: the flame that would erupt in the Filipe dos Santos Revolt was lit.

=== Filipe dos Santos ===
There is not much information about Filipe dos Santos Freire. It is not known where he was born, but his friendship with the potentate Pascoal da Silva Guimarães makes one deduce that he was also Portuguese, as Diogo de Vasconcelos recorded. Some traditions considered him as a "person of color", although modern historiography is based on him being Portuguese. He was a poor person, however, to whom the excessive taxation of the fifth would not affect anything. He had the gift of oratory, being very dear to the people.

== Conspiracy ==
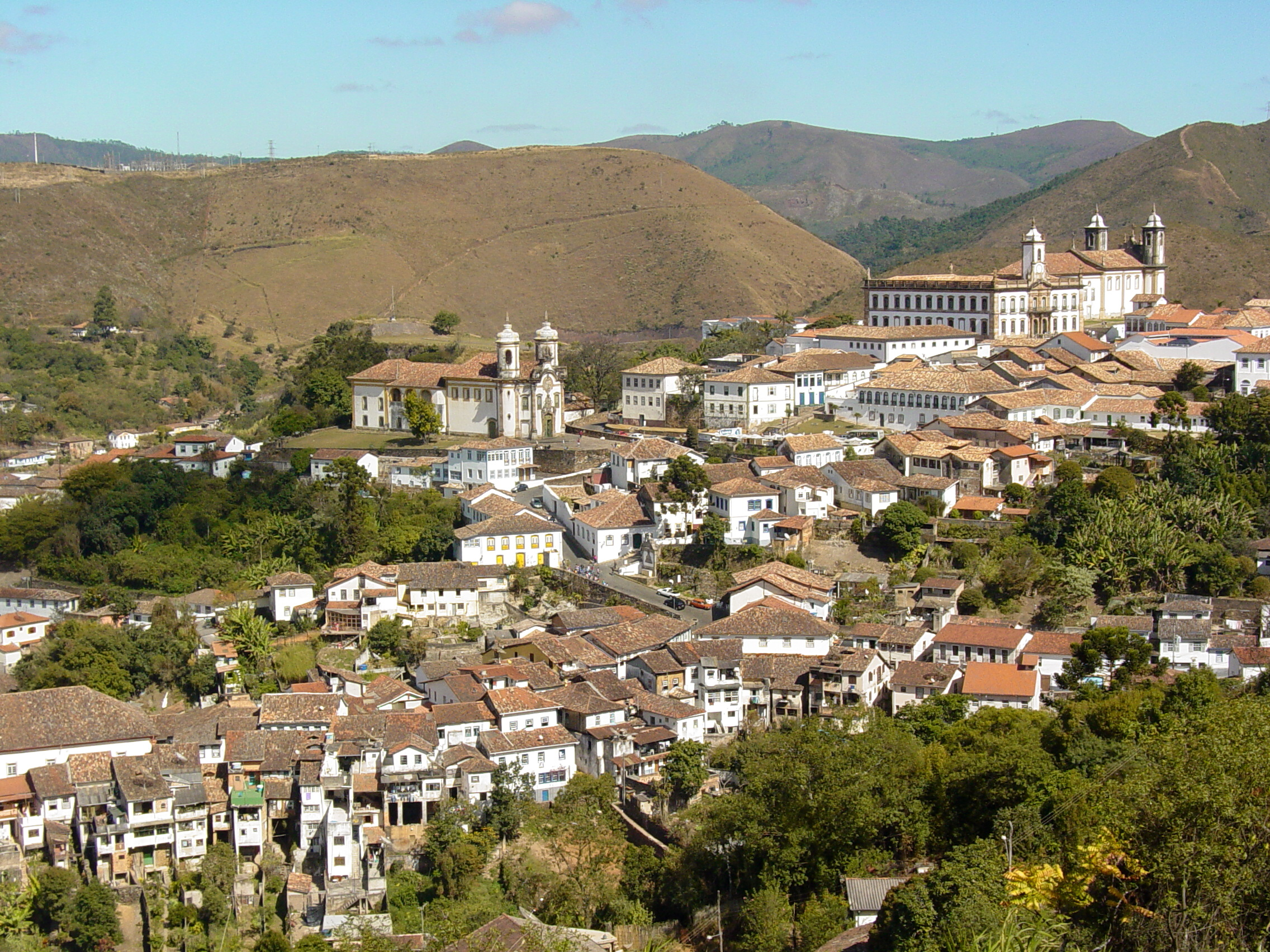
View over Ouro Preto.

The facts led the two potentates of Vila Rica, Manoel Mosqueira Rosa and his sons; and Pascoal da Silva Guimarães to combine a violent action with the humcountble Filipe dos Santos (inspiring the people with his words) that would intimidate ouvidor Martinho Vieira and, through him, demote the governor from his intentions, just as it had happened to his predecessor. Pascoal da Silva had other interests: besides his immense fortune, which included rich gold mines, two large farms, and more than two thousand slaves, he owed the Crown about 30 arrobas of gold. Despite this, three days before the movement broke out, Pascoal's son - João da Silva - had written a letter to Assumar, denouncing the conspiracy, but the only action taken then was to bring the fact to the attention of the ouvidor.

And it was on St. Peter's Night, when the bonfires and the sparking of typical feast fires would help conceal their movements, that, around 11 o'clock at night, the conspirators, masked, descended from the woods of Ouro Podre, where Pascoal Guimarães owned his farms and had previously gathered. They then took the streets of Vila Rica towards the house of the ouvidor to the cries of "Long live the people!" - but Martinho Vieira had already fled.

The rebels then headed for the council's building, when Filipe dos Santos took command of the events through oratory. The seditious, in the building, elaborated a memorial to the governor, then still in his palace in Ribeirão do Carmo. The literate José Peixoto da Silva was responsible for writing it, and it contained the claims of the miners:

- Reduction of various taxes;
- Decrease in procedural costs; (Note: The procedural costs of the so-called mining regions were, ordinarily, much higher than those where there was no extractive activity.)
- Abolition of the commercial monopolies of cattle, tobacco, liquor and salt;
- End of the foundry houses;

They would not lay down their arms until they had met all the pleas. Filipe dos Santos sends José Peixoto himself as his emissary to the governor.

== Minas Gerais rises ==
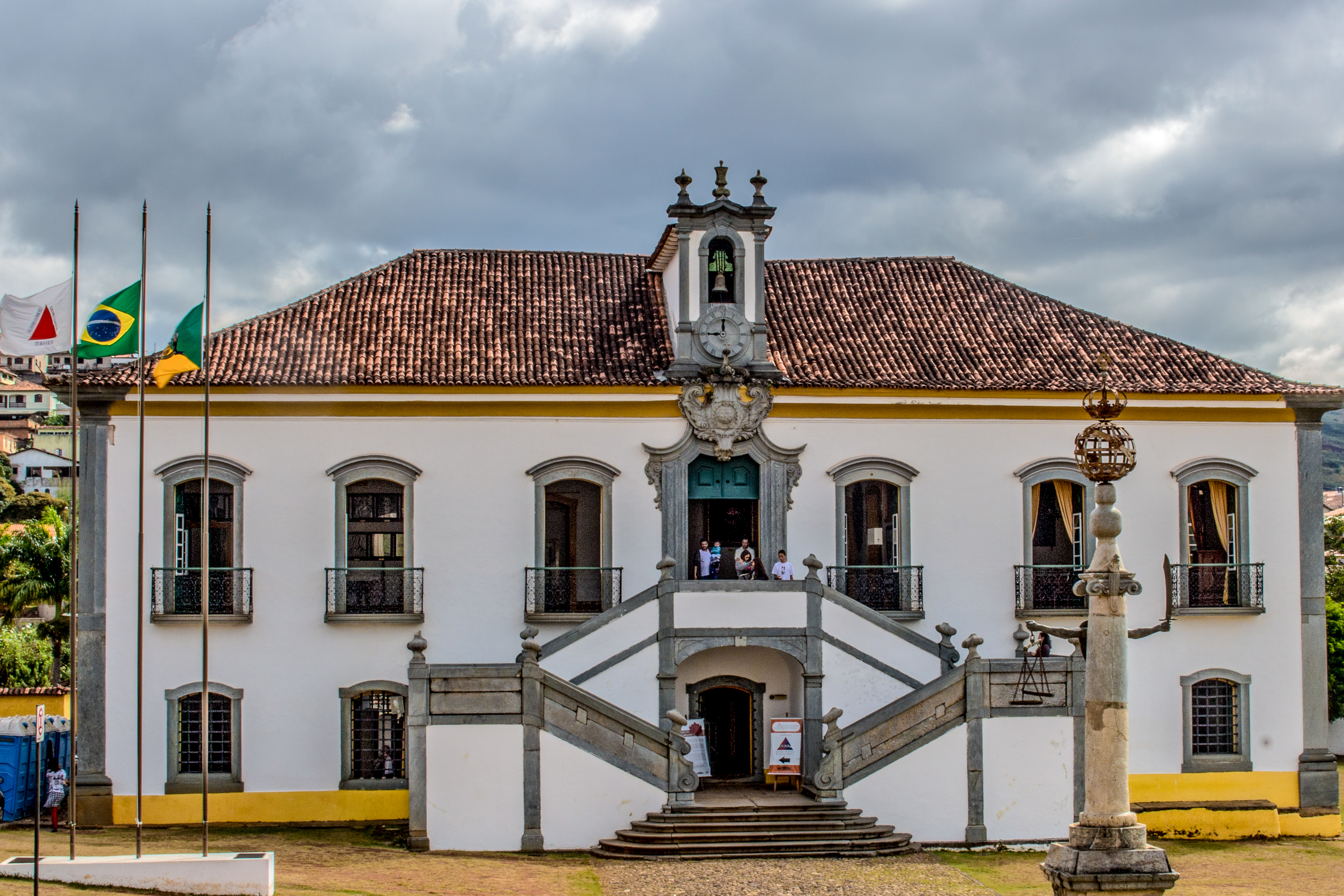
Municipal Chamber of Vila do Carmo

José Peixoto goes to Ribeirão do Carmo (the original name of the city of Mariana), taking the document of the seditionists to the Count. He goes at a gallop, shouting all the way:

The Gerais are risen!

The Count then understood that the situation had reached the extreme limit and tried to gain time. He replied that he would make concessions, but made it conditional that the order should be redone. He also promised to convene a general council to sort out all the issues, but the rebels did not accept this maneuver. On July 2, the rebels all went to where the Count was, in great strides, clamoring that the people had to be attended to. The Count, however, without foreseeing the course of events, sought to fortify himself in his residence, quartering his soldiers there, for he thought it prudent not to move from there. He had asked for reinforcements from Rio de Janeiro and, when he learned that the mob had left Vila Rica, he immediately sent one of his lieutenants and the Chamber of Vila do Carmo to receive them at the entrance to the city.

The mob peacefully enters the Vila, standing in the square in front of the governor's palace where, at one of the windows, Assumar speaks to everyone in a conciliatory manner and, to the disappointment of the leaders, is acclaimed by the crowd. Again, José Peixoto is sent, who, in the courtroom, again presents the demands in writing, to which are added the general pardon, in the name of the King, and other minor requests. To each item, the Count replied: "deferred as you ask."

Peixoto then, at one of the windows, announced to the people the charter granting all their pleas, and again the crowd burst into acclamation, making them return from whence they had left with the conviction that they were victorious. Imagining themselves free from the interference of the Crown, the demands and prerogatives imposed, they set off triumphantly on their return. The governor, however, had acted out of cunning, never intending to fulfill any of those commitments.

== The reaction ==
As soon as the rebels returned to their homes, Assumar took care to organize his retaliation, gathering the Dragoons and also the wealthy of the city, not fond of Vila Rica, to take up arms and provide slaves to reinforce the troops, which then reached 1,500 men.

The Count ordered the Dragoons to arrest the heads of the movement: Pascoal da Silva, Manuel Mosqueira da Rosa, Sebastião da Veiga Cabral and some friars.

Before the Vila could react against the arrest of the leaders, Assumar penetrated the city with his entire contingent, surprising them, on July 16. Filipe dos Santos was preaching the revolt in front of the doors of the church in Cachoeira do Campo, when he was arrested; and in Sabará, Tomé Afonso Pereira was captured, while calling for a reaction. Deceived, the supporters of the uprising still tried to retaliate, but with the arrival of Assumar's troops led by sergeant-major Manuel Gomes da Silva, nothing came of it.

The Count then acted with vengeance and violence, ordering the houses of the rebels to be set on fire. That fire spread and destroyed the streets of the village that today bears the name Morro da Queimada, (Note: Pedro Calmon gives the place its name as Morro da Queimada. As will be seen below about the Archelogical Park, created in 2005, it followed the name used by the former.) which was where Pascoal da Silva's residence was located. Other streets were also consumed by the fire.

Filipe dos Santos, considered the main leader, was summarily tried. According to the sentence, the defendant was to be dragged through the public streets of the village and then quartered, with his parts exhibited in Cachoeira do Campo, São Bartolomeu, Itaubira and Ribeirão. In addition, his property was to be confiscated from the Crown.

=== Filipe dos Santos' execution ===
There are some controversies about how the execution of the leader Filipe dos Santos would have taken place. Clóvis Moura says that there is no consensus about how he was executed: whether by hanging and then quartered, or by tying him to four horses that, when incited, would have broken his body to pieces. However, Diogo de Vasconcelos, who is used as the main source by Clóvis Moura, treated the latter version as a myth:

Many, in agreement with the legend, believe that they tied his arms and legs to four horses, and these tore him to pieces, staggering through the streets which would give the case the blush, at least, of classical cruelties. The truth, however, is perhaps more repulsive: they hanged him, and then tied him to a horse's tail, and he was torn to pieces.

— Diogo de Vasconcelos

Other authors, like Carlos Mota, only state that he was hanged and quartered, as was Souto Maior. Pedro Calmon gives the following description, without being specific:

Arrested, Filipe dos Santos was hanged, on July 15, 1720. On the scaffold, he uttered this sentence: "I swore to die for freedom, I keep my word.". The rebel's corpse was butchered...

— Pedro Calmon

Mota, however, adds that after the quartering, he had his severed head hung from a pole, and the other parts of his body exposed along the roads.

== The consequences ==
Winner, the Count of Assumar imposed all his wills: the Chambers were silent, the people were submissive while the governor's police watched over the entire district, with heavy legislation that subdued everyone. The foundry houses were then installed, starting to function as of 1725.

The roads became even more limited for the gold flow, in order to avoid smuggling and tax evasion. A safe conduct system was created, and customs and toll stations were erected on the roads leading to the mining regions.

Despite this, discontent remained latent. Other revolts occurred in Brejo do Salgado (1736), Montes Claros (1736), the Curvelo Conspiracy (1775). And, even with the increased surveillance, new forms of smuggling evaded inspection, increasing the exchange with the Río de la Plata region.

One can still point out as a consequence of the uprising the emancipation of the Capitancy of Minas do Ouro from that of São Paulo, and the fact that it has been registered that, in the movement, people were talking about an idea of a Republic, making the revolt being considered a precursor to the Minas Gerais Conspiracy of 1789.

== Document ==
After the events, the Count of Assumar recorded:

...I will briefly explain the manner in which riots are formed in this country, and the manner in which the people enter into them. These never take place until midnight, in the greatest silence. This is proof enough that the people, neither now, nor in past uprisings, have ever cared to rise, although, after being forcibly excited by the leaders, it seems that they willingly sustain the riot. Such is the nature of it, that to rejoice and revel in its own evil. It is enough to be novel and without reason, because they are there for manhood and whim, to follow everything that comes against reason, against piety and against gratitude (...) The riot is usually started by six or seven masked men, accompanied by thirty or forty armed black men, some of whom occupy the mouths of the streets, others are ordered to go knocking, and where they don't open soon, they break down the doors of the inhabitants, which, as most of them are on the ground floor, limited and of little resistance, any push convinces them. Running through the streets, and shouting - Long live the people, or die! - the villagers, not suddenly experiencing any violence on the farm or in their lives, take steps to their detriment, like flocks of sheep following the very wolves that devour them. After having alarmed the people, who still don't know what this gathering is for, a masked man stands up and begins to say in a loud voice: My people, do you want us to do this or that? And if everyone doesn't say yes, the armed blacks either kill or wound some of those who are closest to them; until the others, for not falling into the same disgrace, agree with what the masks say.

— Pedro Miguel de Almeida Portugal e Vasconcelos (1688-1756)

== Analysis ==
According to Lúcio dos Santos "...when all is said and done, the revolt of 1720 was not genuinely popular. In reality, however, it was already gradually forming and affirming the consciousness of the new nationality, so that open resistance to the excesses of power emerged."

Silva and Bastos consider it as of merely local amplitude, and which did not seek to contest Portuguese domination, but only against its abuses, without any emancipationist intention.

== Cultural Impact ==
Sleep, my boy, sleep,

- may God teach you the lesson

of those who suffer in this world

violence and persecution.

Filipe dos Santos died:

others, however, will be born.

— Cecília Meireles, Romance V - ou da Destruição do Ouro Podre

The poet Cecília Meireles left, in her Romanceiro da Inconfidência (Romance of the Inconfidence), a song in which she laments the Count of Assumar's destruction and persecution of Filipe dos Santos and the other rebels. There, her verses portray a cruel executioner - "They say the Count laughed! But the ones who laugh, also cry", for he abused power, and betrayed his own word.

Carlos Drummond de Andrade also consigned about the same place that "[The ruins of Morro da Queimada] are rough, cruel, and it comes from that day in July 1720, when the Conde de Assumar's soldiers set fire to the city of Ouro Podre."

=== Archaeological Park ===
One of the key places of the uprising, Morro da Queimada, was transformed into the Archaeological Park of Morro da Queimada, approved by the Ministry of Culture, and published in the Official Gazette of the Federal Government, on December 21, 2005.

The project aims to create an ecomuseum, consisting of an iconographic collection, preservation of the historical site and also historical research, among others.

== See also ==
- List of rebellions and revolutions in Brazil
- List of historical acts of tax resistance
- Bahian Conspiracy
- Minas Gerais Conspiracy

== Bibliography ==
- Anastasia, Carla Maria Junho (1998). Vassalos Rebeldes: Violência Coletiva Nas Minas Na Primeira Metade Do Século XVIII (in Portuguese). Belo Horizonte: Editora C/Arte.
- Aquino, Rubim Santos Leão de (1999). "Rebeliões, guerras internas e repressão". Sociedade Brasileira: Uma História Através dos Movimentos Sociais (in Portuguese). Vol. 1 (2nd ed.). São Paulo: Editora Record. ISBN 978-85-01-05674-0.
- Calmon, Pedro (1939). "As Agitações Nativistas: Nas Minas". História da Civilização Brasileira (in Portuguese) (3rd ed.). São Paulo: Cia. Editora Nacional.
- Maior, A. Souto (1968). "X - O sentimento nativista: a revolta de Vila Rica. Filipe dos Santos". História do Brasil (in Portuguese) (6th ed.). São Paulo: Cia. Editora Nacional.
- Mello e Souza, Laura de (1995). Discurso Histórico e Político sobre a Sublevação que nas Minas Houve no Ano de 1720 (in Portuguese). Belo Horizonte: Fundação João Pinheiro. pp. 84–85.
- Mota, Carlos Guilherme. "Na Rota das Inconfidências: A Revolta de Filipe dos Santos". História do Brasil: Uma Interpretação (in Portuguese). pp. 196–197.
- Moura, Clóvis (2004). "entry: Filipe dos Santos". Dicionário da Escravidão Negra no Brasil (in Portuguese). Edusp. p. 373. ISBN 978-85-314-0812-0.
- Silva, Francisco de Assis; Bastos, Pedro Ivo de Assis (1976). "Os Principais Movimentos Nativistas". História do Brasil: Colônia, Império e República (in Portuguese) (illustrated ed.). São Paulo: Editora Moderna.
- Vasconcelos, Diogo de (1948). História Antiga de Minas Gerais (in Portuguese). Rio de Janeiro: Imprensa Nacional. pp. 201–202.
