= Legion of São Paulo =

The Legion of São Paulo (Portuguese: Legião de São Paulo) was a Paulista militia created in 1775 by the captain-general of the Captaincy of São Paulo, Martim Lopes Lobo Saldanha.

== History ==
The legion's creation was aimed at the Paulista reconquest of the territory corresponding to present-day Rio Grande do Sul, which had been occupied by the Spanish since 1763. Historically, Paulistas, especially the Bandeirantes, are known for being great warriors and explorers, this reputation was one of the motivations for the creation of the militia.
