= Captaincy of Itanhaém =

Former territorial division of Brazil

Captaincy of Itanhaém Capitania de Itanhaém
- 1624-1753
- Flag of the United Kingdom of Portugal, Brazil, and the Algarves Coat of arms of the United Kingdom of Portugal, Brazil and the Algarves
- Capital: Vila Conceição de Itanhaém
- Religion: Catholicism
- Government: Absolute monarchy
  - First donatário: Mariana de Sousa Guerra, Countess of Vimieiro
  - First captain major: Djalma Fogaça

Establishment
  - Creation of the Captaincy: 1624
  - Annexation to the Captaincy of São Paulo: 1753

The Captaincy of Itanhaém was one of the hereditary captaincies of colonial Brazil.

== Territory ==
The territory of the Captaincy of Itanhaém covered practically the entire southern coast of São Paulo, the Ribeira Valley and the northern coast of Paraná. However, its legal extension was the subject of great controversy. Its first donatária, Mariana de Sousa Guerra, Countess of Vimieiro, promoted explorers' incursions into the Paraíba Valley, the northern coast of Rio de Janeiro and the south of Minas Gerais, as she believed that all these areas, from the region of present-day Cabo Frio to Ilha do Mel, passing through the interior and unexplored hinterlands, belonged to the jurisdiction of her captaincy.

== History ==
In 1621, Mariana de Sousa Guerra, Countess of Vimieiro, was declared donatária of the Captaincy of São Vicente, since she was the granddaughter of Martim Afonso de Sousa, the former owner of the area. However, in 1624, after controversies over her right to possession of the territory raised by another heir, Álvaro Pires de Castro e Sousa, Count of Monsanto, Mariana was removed from her position. Displeased with the situation, she founded her own captaincy on February 6, 1624, based in Vila Conceição de Itanhaém. Mariana was a Portuguese woman who had never been to Brazil and, in order to govern her territory, she appointed a captain major; the first was Djalma Fogaça and the last was João de Moura Fogaça.

The captaincy became decisive for the progress of the colony and of the future country, as it was the starting point for the first longer incursions into the interior of the continent. These expeditions were responsible for creating settlements in territories that are today located in the interior of São Paulo, such as Taubaté and Sorocaba, and for exploring regions that later became the states of Paraná, Minas Gerais, Goiás and Mato Grosso.

Over the next few decades, groups of explorers searched for treasures in the backlands of today's Minas Gerais, in the areas of the captaincies of Itanháem and São Vicente. When gold was found, prospectors from other places in the colony and even abroad disputed the ownership and exploitation of the mining region, which led many explorers from Itanhaém to ally with those from São Vicente in a battle against the outsiders, resulting in the War of the Emboabas. Later, under the name paulistas, they were defeated. In 1709, as a result of the conflict, the mining territory that then belonged to the Captaincy of Itanhaém was merged with the territory of the Captaincy of São Vicente, which was extinguished to create the Captaincy of São Paulo and Minas de Ouro. However, the Captaincy of Itanhaém continued to exist for decades.

Throughout its existence, the Captaincy of Itanhaém belonged to the Countess of Vimieiro and her descendants, who assumed the title of Count of Príncipe Island. They fought in court with the holders of the family of the Count of Monsanto, trying to regain possession of the Captaincy of São Vicente, in a process that lasted more than a century.

The Captaincy of Itanhaém lasted from 1624 to 1753, when its donatário sold it to the Portuguese Crown, which annexed it to the Captaincy of São Paulo.

== See also ==
- Captaincies of Brazil
