= Pedro López =

Pedro López may refer to:

== Sports ==
- Pedro Hugo López (1927–1959), Chilean footballer
- Pedro López Jiménez (born 1942), Spanish businessman and vice chairman of Real Madrid football club
- Pedro López (footballer, born November 1983), Spanish footballer
- Pedro López (footballer, born August 1983), Spanish footballer
- Pedro López (baseball) (born 1984), Dominican MLB baseball player
- Pedro López (footballer, born 1995), Spanish football goalkeeper
- Pedro López (footballer, born 1997), Spanish footballer
- Pedro López (football manager) (born 1979), Spanish football manager

== Others ==
- Pedro López de Monforte (fl. 1103–1135), Spanish nobleman and governor
- Pero López de Ayala (1332–1407), Spanish poet and statesman
- Pedro López (painter) (fl. 1608), Spanish painter
- Pedro Aquilino López (1857–1935), Colombian businessman and politician
- Pedro López Lagar (1899–1977), Spanish-born Argentine film actor
- Pedro Lopez (legislator) (1906–1957), Filipino politician
- Pedro López (serial killer) (born 1948), Colombian serial killer and rapist
- Pedro López Quintana (born 1953), Spanish Roman Catholic archbishop and diplomat

== See also ==
- Pedro Lopes (disambiguation)
