= Captaincy of São Paulo =

1720–1821 Brazilian captaincy

Captaincy of São Paulo Capitania de São Paulo
- 1720–1821
- Flag, 1815–1821 Coat of arms, 1815–1821

- Captaincy of São Paulo in 1821, before its conversion into a province
- Status: Captaincy of the State of Brazil (1720–1815); Captaincy of the Kingdom of Brazil (1815–1821)
- Capital: São Paulo; 23°36′3″S 46°42′42″W
- Common languages: Portuguese (Note: Official language.)
- Government: Absolute monarchy
- Governor
  - 1721–1727: Rodrigo César de Meneses
  - 1819–1821: João Carlos Augusto de Oyenhausen-Gravenburg
- Legislature: Cortes
- Historical era: Colonial Brazil
  - Created from the division of the Captaincy of São Paulo and Minas de Ouro: 2 December 1720
  - Captaincy of Goiás and Captaincy of Mato Grosso separated: 9 May 1748
  - Administrative autonomy restored: 1765
  - Converted into the Province of São Paulo: 28 February 1821
- Currency: Réis
Preceded by
Captaincy of São Paulo and Minas de Ouro
Captaincy of Itanhaém
Succeeded by
Captaincy of Santa Catarina
Captaincy of São Pedro do Rio Grande do Sul
Captaincy of Goiás
Captaincy of Mato Grosso
Province of São Paulo
- Today part of: Brazil

The Royal Captaincy of São Paulo (Portuguese: Capitania Real de São Paulo) was a captaincy of Colonial Brazil, established in 1720 after the division of the Captaincy of São Paulo and Minas de Ouro.

The earlier captaincy had been created in 1709, in the aftermath of the War of the Emboabas, when the Portuguese Crown purchased and reorganized the former donatary territories of São Vicente and Santo Amaro as part of a wider effort to assert control over the gold-producing interior.

On 2 December 1720, John V of Portugal separated the mining region into the new Captaincy of Minas Gerais, while the remaining territory became the Captaincy of São Paulo.

== History ==
In 1720, the Portuguese Crown divided the Captaincy of São Paulo and Minas de Ouro into the captaincies of São Paulo and Minas Gerais. The earlier captaincy had been created in 1709 after disputes over the gold-mining region, including the War of the Emboabas. The Crown purchased the donatary territories of São Vicente, Santo Amaro, and Santana and joined them to the mining region.

The mining districts became Minas Gerais. The coastal towns of Santos, Paraty, Ubatuba, and São Sebastião were assigned to São Paulo. Rodrigo César de Meneses took office as governor in 1721. His government brought the mines of Cuiabá, discovered around 1718, under Portuguese administration. Gold was found in Goiás in 1725. Goods passed through São Paulo between the Atlantic coast, the Rio da Prata region, Cuiabá, and Goiás.

The Government Secretariat of the Captaincy was operating by 1721. It assisted the captains-general and handled the captaincy's administration until 1823.

Paraty belonged to São Paulo in civil matters after the division of 1720, while its courts remained under Rio de Janeiro. A royal order issued in 1726 returned the town to the Captaincy of Rio de Janeiro. The transfer took effect in 1727.

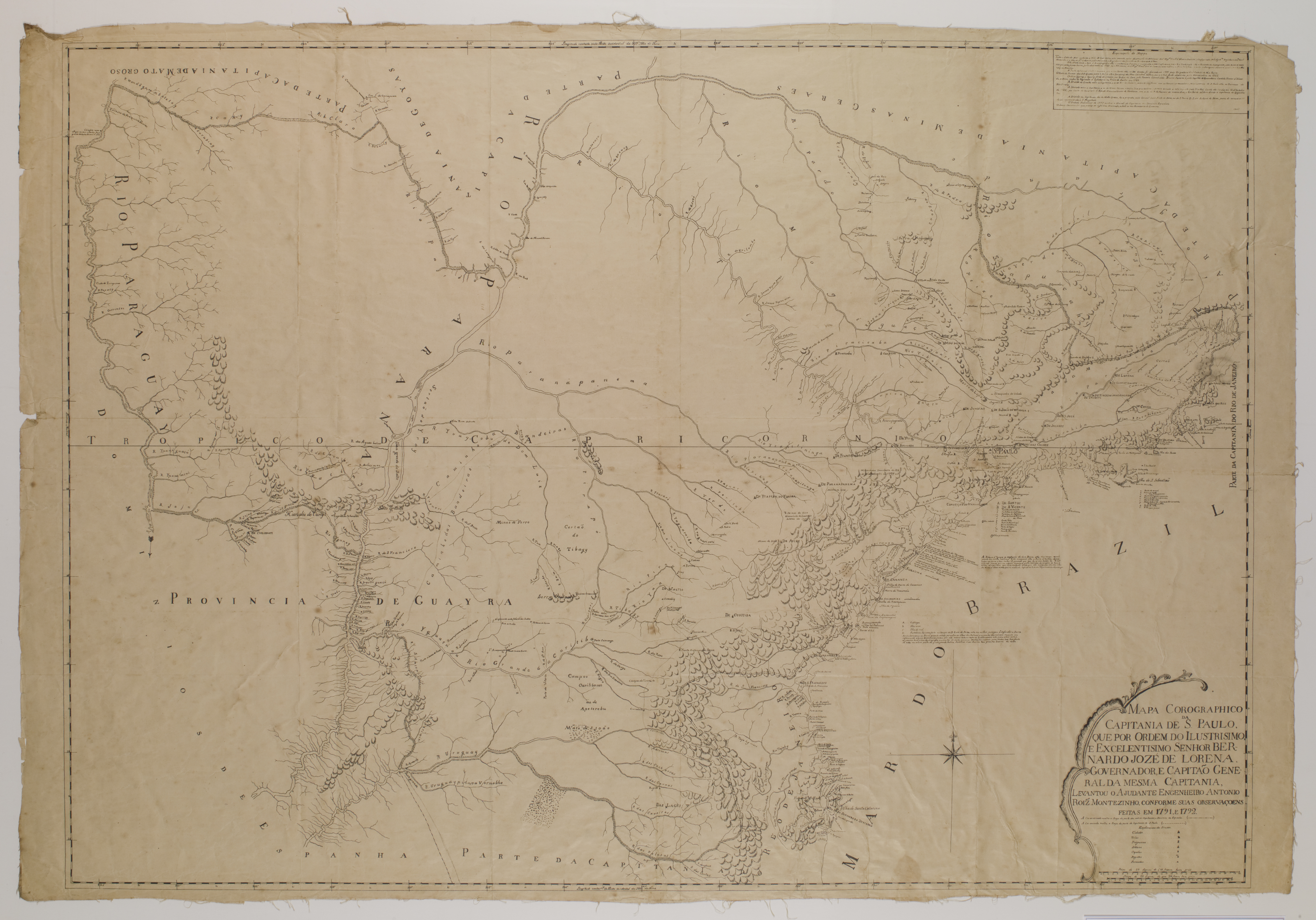
Chorographic map of the Captaincy of São Paulo, 1792, held by the Museu Paulista.

A royal provision transferred the island of Santa Catarina and its mainland frontier from São Paulo in 1738. Later divisions created the captaincies of Santa Catarina and São Pedro do Rio Grande do Sul.

In May 1748, the Crown separated the captaincies of Goiás and Mato Grosso from São Paulo. São Paulo lost its captain-general and was placed under the governor and captain-general of the Captaincy of Rio de Janeiro.

In September 1764, Luís Diogo Lobo da Silva, governor of Minas Gerais, took control of territory on the left bank of the Sapucaí River. The action moved the Minas Gerais boundary near its present line with São Paulo.

São Paulo recovered administrative autonomy in 1765. Luís António de Sousa Botelho Mourão, the fourth Morgado de Mateus, governed the restored captaincy from 1765 to 1775. His government founded settlements, recruited settlers, selected sites, and set out street plans.

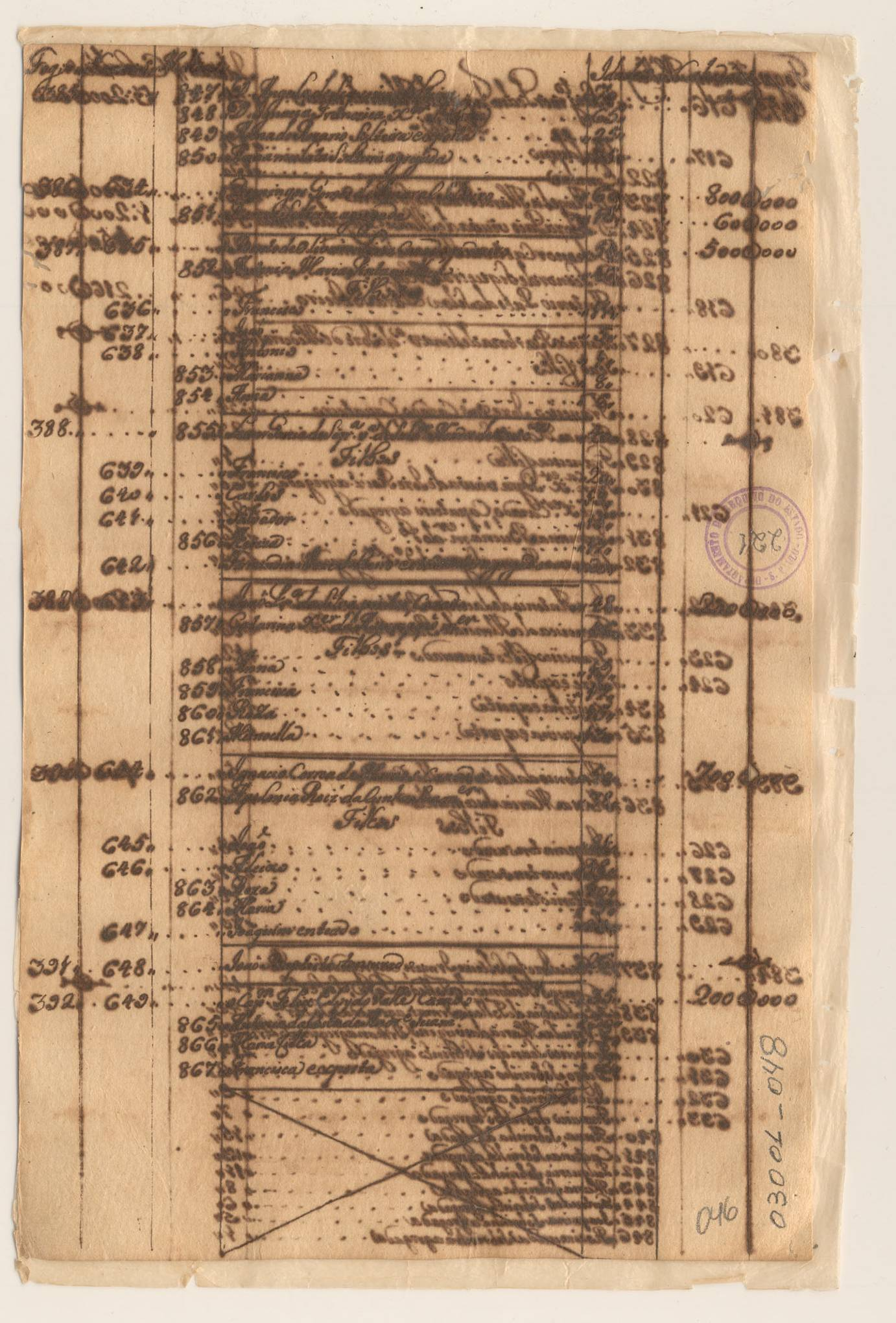
Population register for the city of São Paulo, 1765. APESP.

The town of Lages, founded in 1766, remained under São Paulo after the southern divisions. A royal charter of 9 September 1820 separated Lages and its surrounding district from São Paulo and incorporated them into Santa Catarina.

In 1821, the captaincies of Brazil became provinces. A decree of 1 October established provisional governing boards in São Paulo and the other provinces governed by captains-general. It abolished the titles of governor and captain-general. The former captaincy became the Province of São Paulo and passed to the Empire of Brazil after independence. Imperial Law No. 704 separated the district of Curitiba from São Paulo on 29 August 1853 and created the Province of Paraná.

=== Archival material ===
Muster roll of the Úteis Militia Infantry Regiment of the Captaincy of São Paulo. APESP.

Archives in Brazil and Portugal hold material from the captaincy. Projeto Resgate Barão do Rio Branco has catalogued manuscripts about São Paulo at the Arquivo Histórico Ultramarino. An early catalogue covered 5,113 items in 66 boxes, dated from 1618 to 1823.

APESP holds the Archive of the Government Secretariat of the Captaincy of São Paulo. Its papers contain requests, royal charters, notices, ordinances, patents, and grants of sesmarias. They concern government administration, defense, settlement, population counts, and the economy.

The archive covers material dated from 1611 to 1852, extending beyond the captaincy period. It was entered in the Brazilian National Register of the UNESCO Memory of the World Programme in 2015.

== Economy ==
In the first half of the eighteenth century, the economy of the Captaincy of São Paulo was closely connected to the mining regions of the interior. The discovery of gold at Cuiabá in 1718 and in Goiás in 1725 helped make São Paulo a center for the distribution of goods between the Atlantic coast, the Rio da Prata region, and the interior of Portuguese America.Agricultural production, livestock raising, and overland commerce supplied mining districts with foodstuffs, pack animals, slaves, and imported goods. São Paulo merchants sent products such as aguardente, salt, iron, mules, sugar, and wine toward Goiás, while the routes to Cuiabá and the southern fields linked the captaincy to wider colonial markets.

The restoration of São Paulo's administrative autonomy in 1765 was accompanied by renewed efforts to stimulate settlement, agriculture, and internal communications. The captaincy's economy remained diversified, combining subsistence production with commercial agriculture and livestock. Contemporary descriptions listed maize, beans, rice, manioc, sugarcane, cotton, coffee, tobacco, manioc flour, cattle, horses, pigs, and mules among the products that sustained local and regional trade.

From the late eighteenth century into the early nineteenth century, sugar became the captaincy's leading export crop, especially in the agricultural areas of the plateau. This expansion encouraged the improvement of routes between the interior and the coast and strengthened the role of the port of Santos as São Paulo's principal maritime outlet. Although the captaincy produced a range of agricultural goods, sugar was the predominant commodity in this period, and Santos became increasingly important as the point through which products from the plateau entered coastal, Atlantic, and imperial trading networks.

Royal revenue was also tied to the captaincy's commercial routes and productive activity. Taxes and monopolies were commonly administered through contracts, including tithes, duties on passages and routes, and other tax-farming arrangements. These contracts reflected the economic importance of São Paulo's position between the coast, the mining districts, and the southern frontier.

== See also ==
- List of governors of São Paulo

== General references ==
- Liberali Bellotto, Heloísa; Matos Reis, Gilson Sérgio (2002). Arruda, José Jobson de Andrade (ed.). Documentos Manuscritos Avulsos da Capitania de São Paulo.
- Karepovs, Dainis (2004). Parlamentar da Província de São Paulo - Prudente de Morais. Assembléia Legislativa do Estado de São Paulo.
- Berllotto, Heloísa Liberali (1979). Autoridade e conflito no Brasil Colônia, O governo do Morgado de Mateus em São Paulo. IMESP.
- Pereira de Sousa, Washington Luís (1938). Capitania de São Paulo - O governo de Rodrigo César de Meneses. Companhia Editora Nacional.
