= Gold cycle =

Biogeochemical cycle

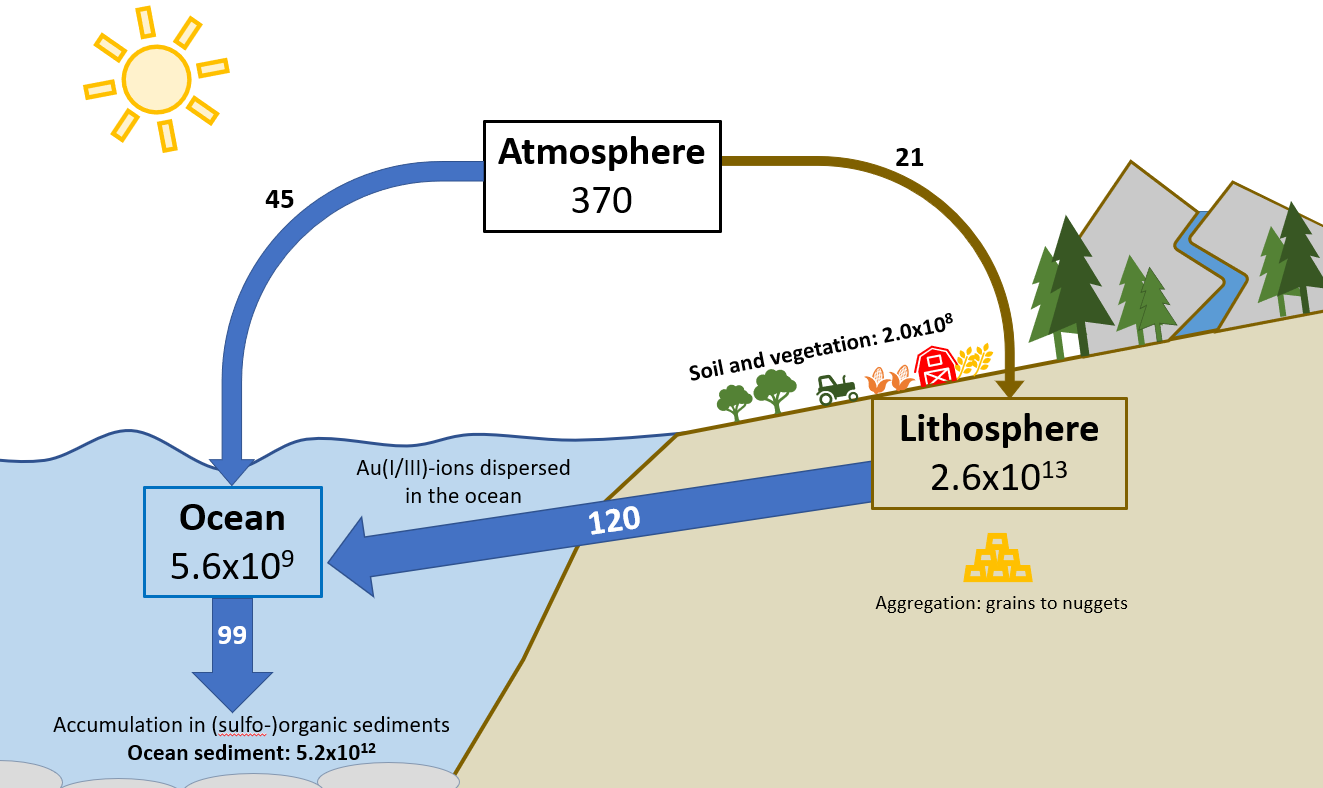
Biogeochemical cycle of gold showing major reservoirs and fluxes of gold in the environment. The fluxes shown with blue and brown arrows representing fluxes that build reservoirs in the hydrosphere and lithosphere, respectively. All units shown are in Mg for reservoirs and Mg/yr for fluxes.

The gold cycle is the biogeochemical cycling of gold through the lithosphere, hydrosphere, atmosphere, and biosphere. Gold is a noble transition metal that is highly mobile in the environment and subject to biogeochemical cycling, driven largely by microorganisms. Gold undergoes processes of solubilization, stabilization, bioreduction, biomineralization, aggregation, and ligand utilization throughout its cycle. These processes are influenced by various microbial populations and cycling of other elements such as carbon, nitrogen, and sulfur. Gold exists in several forms in the Earth's surface environment including Au(I/III)-complexes, nanoparticles, and placer gold particles (nuggets and grains). The gold biogeochemical cycle is highly complex and strongly intertwined with cycling of other metals including silver, copper, iron, manganese, arsenic, and mercury. Gold is important in the biotech field for applications such as mineral exploration, processing and remediation, development of biosensors and drug delivery systems, industrial catalysts, and for recovery of gold from electronic waste.

== Lithosphere ==
The lithosphere is the dominant reservoir of gold, containing an estimated 2.6 × 10^{13} Mg. Today, gold exists primarily as electrum, in hard rock deposits like tellurides, and as particles in placers in Earth's crust. Gold cycling starts with the microbial weathering of gold-bearing rocks and minerals which mobilizes gold in the environment via release of elemental gold and solubilization. The Witwatersrand gold deposits host approximately 30% of the world's gold resources, a large proportion of which is directly associated with organic carbon derived from microbial mats. Gold ore has been mined in many countries, including Japan, India, Spain, Yugoslavia, South Africa, Australia, the United States of America, Canada, Colombia, Mexico, and Brazil.

== Ocean ==
The ocean reservoir contains an estimated 5.6 × 10^{9} Mg of gold and oceanic gold concentration is about 4 ng Au/L with higher values in some coastal waters. Au(I/III)-ions and Au(0)-colloids are unstable under surface conditions in aqueous solutions and commonly form ligand complexes with substances excreted by microorganisms. Similar to silver and mercury, these mobile Au(I/III)-complexes are toxic in nature. Some bacteria that live in biofilms on placer gold particle surfaces deal with this toxicity by precipitating Au(I/III)-complexes which leads to the biomineralization of gold. Other archaea, iron-reducing bacteria, and some sulfate-reducing bacteria have developed methods to regulate and detoxify their immediate environment when Au(III)-ions are present at toxic levels. Iron- and sulfur-oxidizing litho-autotrophic bacteria break down gold-hosting sulfide minerals, releasing gold as alloy particles or Au(I)-thiosulfate complexes. Eventually, gold nanoparticles released by these processes undergo transformation, are dispersed in oceans, or accumulate in sediments.

== Atmosphere ==
The atmosphere is the smallest reservoir of gold, containing an estimated 370 Mg. The most volatile gold compounds are Au_{2}Cl_{6}, which may occur in volcanic gases, and AuF_{3}.

== Influences and interactions of other biogeochemical cycles ==
The biogeochemical cycle of gold is affected by the carbon, nitrogen, sulfur, and iron cycles. Decomposition of organic carbon under anoxic conditions creates a wide range of organic intermediates, e.g., organic acids, that are important determinants of gold mobility. Key microbial processes in the nitrogen cycle can be influenced by gold and vice versa; for example autotrophic denitrifying bacteria can destabilize Au-complexes and may play a role in gold cycling. Overall, it is likely that gold mobility, biomineralization, and ore forming processes are impacted by the reactive nitrogen-containing compounds. Gold is commonly incorporated in iron-sulfides and adsorbed by Fe(III)-oxyhydroxide precipitates; oxidation of gold-bearing pyrite can lead to the mobilization of soluble gold complexes.

== Ancient Earth ==
Throughout Earth's history, the interplay of gold, microorganisms, and physicochemical conditions such as pH and redox potential have led to the aggregation of gold particles to form grains and nuggets. Cyanobacteria in shallow surface waters on early anoxic Earth accumulated gold complexes dissolved in the water and geochemical modeling indicates that gold solubility in ancient waterbodies was much higher than today. Experimental evidence suggests that on early Earth, Fe(III)-reducing extremophiles and sulfate-reducing bacteria may have been contributed to formation of gold-bearing deposits.

== See also ==
- California Gold Rush
- Biogeochemical cycle
