= Pedro Lopes =

Pedro Lopes may refer to:

- Pedro Santana Lopes (born 1956), Portuguese lawyer and politician; Prime Minister of Portugal, 2004 to 2005
- Pedro Lopes (soccer), retired American soccer player
- Pedro Lopes (Cape Verdean politician) (born 1986), Cape Verdean politician

== See also ==
- Pedro López (disambiguation)
