= Captaincies of Brazil =

1534–1815 Portuguese administrative divisions of colonial Brazil

Captaincies of Brazil Capitanias do Brasil
- 1534–1549
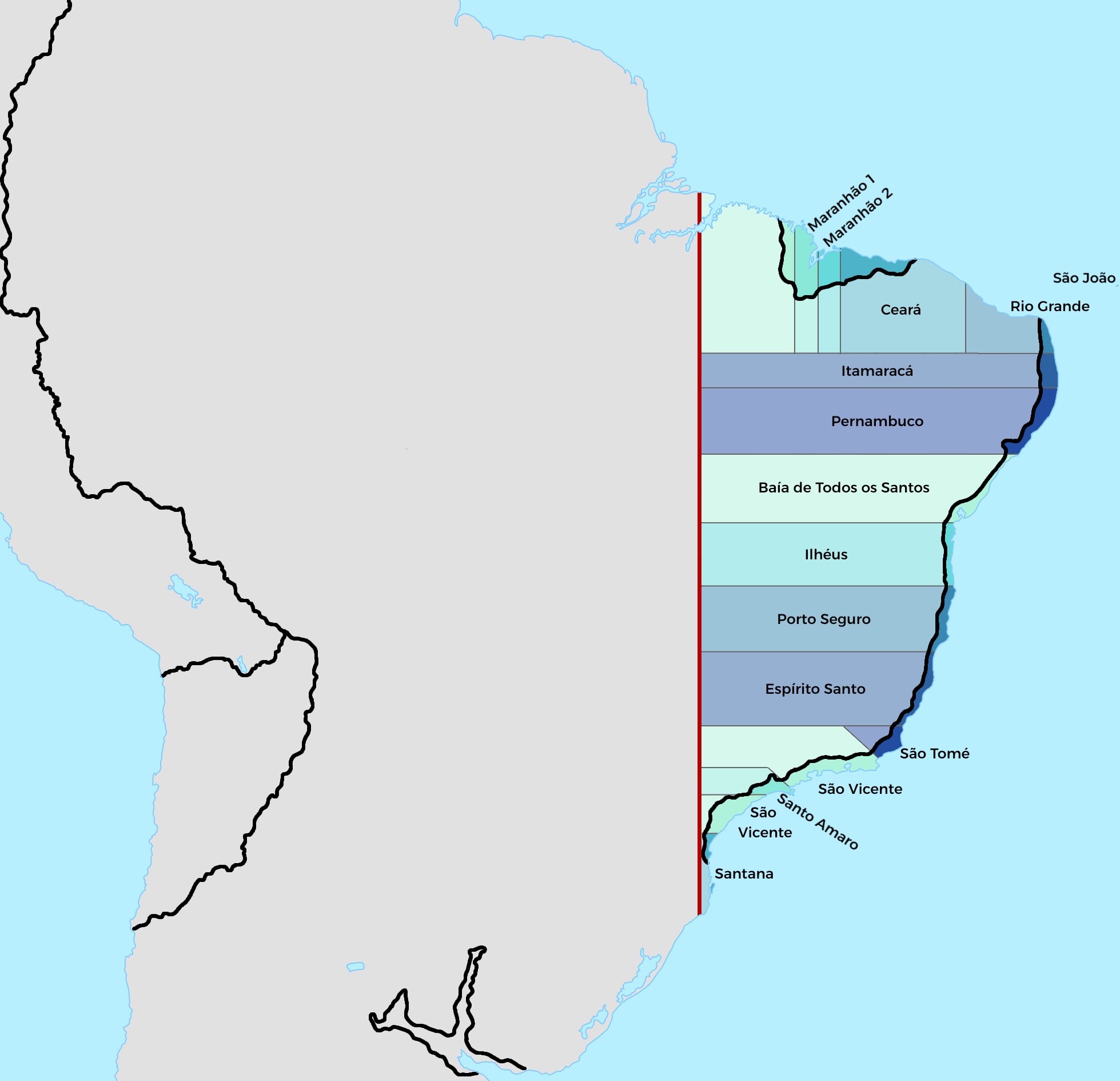
- Captaincy colonies in 1534 (classic view)
- Status: Colonies of the Portuguese Empire
- Capital: Various capitals
- Common languages: Portuguese
- Religion: Roman Catholicism
- Government: Monarchy
- Monarch
  - 1534–1549: John III
- History
  - Established: 1534
  - Disestablished: 1549
- Currency: Portuguese Real
Succeeded by
Governorate General of Brazil

The Captaincies of Brazil (Portuguese: Capitanias do Brasil) were captaincies of the Portuguese Empire, (Note: in Portuguese, Capitanias Hereditárias, from capitão, in English captain) administrative divisions and hereditary fiefs of Portugal in the colony of Terra de Santa Cruz, (Note: Land of the Holy Cross) later called Brazil, on the Atlantic coast of northeastern South America. Each was granted to a single donee, a Portuguese nobleman who was given the title captain General.

Beginning in the early 16th century, the Portuguese monarchy used proprietorships or captaincies—land grants with extensive governing privileges—as a tool to colonize new lands. Prior to the grants in Brazil, the captaincy system had been successfully used in territories claimed by Portugal—-notably including Madeira, the Azores, and other Atlantic islands.

In contrast to the generally successful Atlantic captaincies, of all the captaincies of Brazil, only two, the captaincies of Pernambuco and São Vicente (later called São Paulo), are today considered to have been successful. For reasons varying from abandonment, defeat by aboriginal tribes, occupation of Northeast Brazil by the Dutch West India Company, and death of the donatário (lord proprietor) without an heir, all of the proprietorships (captaincies) eventually reverted to or were repurchased by the crown.

They were effectively subsumed by the Governorates General and the States of Brazil and Maranhão starting in 1549, and the last of the privately granted captaincies reverted to the Crown in 1754. Their final boundaries in the latter half of the 18th century became the basis for the provinces of Brazil.

== Establishment as colonies ==
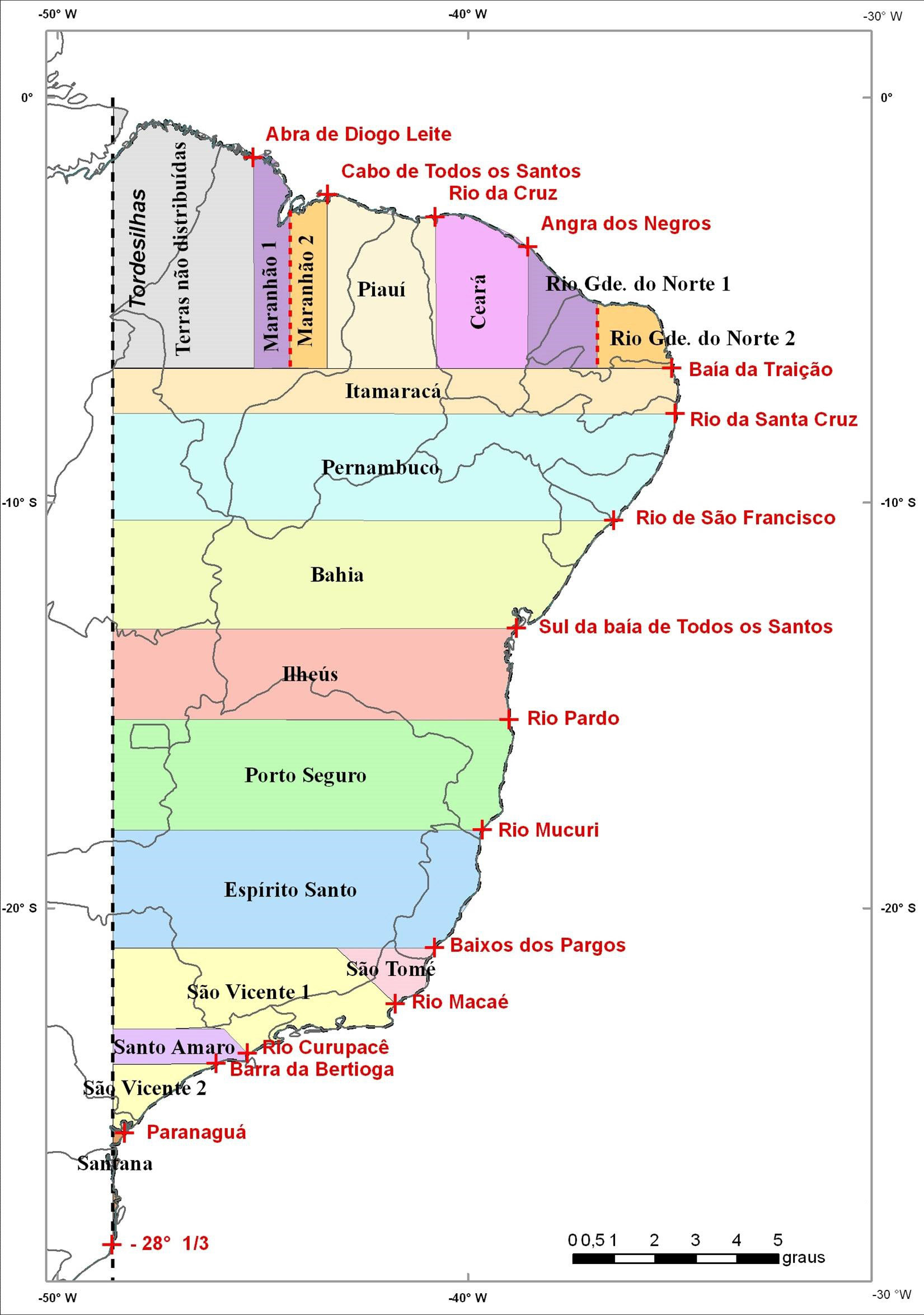
Captaincy colonies in 1534 (revised view)

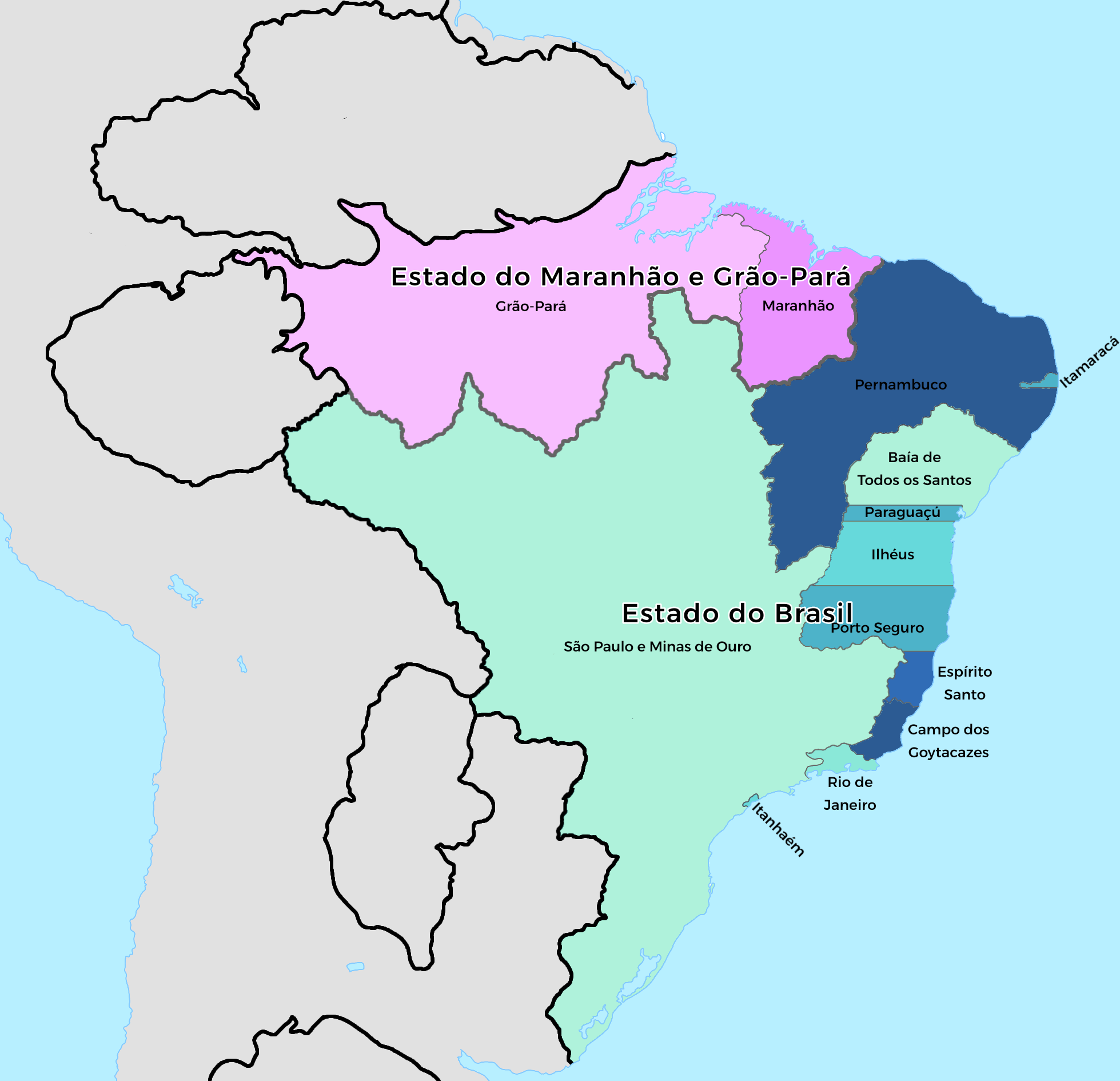
Brazil in 1709 with São Vicente at its largest

Following the successful expedition of Martim Afonso de Sousa in 1530, in order to exploit the trade in brazilwood discovered on the Atlantic coast, as well as explore rumors of vast riches in silver and gold in the interior, the Portuguese Crown determined to establish permanent colonies in their claim on the new continent. The Portuguese realized that they had no human or financial resources to invest in a large and distant colony, and decided to enlist private entrepreneurs, called donatários. Each would become owner and administrator of a capitania or captaincy, a land grant. This system had previously been successful in settling of the Portuguese colonies, first in Madeira, the Azores and various islands mostly along the coast of Africa.

The first captaincies were drawn in strips parallel to the equator, commencing at the Atlantic coast and terminating in the west at the Tordesillas Line (where Spanish territory began). They were established by King John III of Portugal, starting with Pernambuco by the royal "Golden Letter" (Carto Dourado) on 24 September 1534.

Within a system of royal patronage and nepotism, five of the captaincies were given to two cousins of finance minister António de Ataíde: Martim Afonso de Sousa and his brother Pero Lopes. An additional captaincy was issued to Pero de Gois, captain of Afonso's 1530 expedition. The remaining captaincies were granted to a trusted mixture of military men (more precisely called conquistadores) and court bureaucrats.

Each captaincy was to be of fifty leagues "height" (measured north-south), but in practice, boundaries were marked by pairs of rivers, a plethora of which emptied into the Atlantic Ocean on the northeastern coast of the continent. So actual heights varied, as shown in the map at right. Initially fifteen, they were granted to twelve donees. They were the following (north to south):

Captaincy	Donatário
Captaincy of Maranhão (1st section)	Fernão Aires and João de Barros
Captaincy of Maranhão (2nd section)	Fernando Álvares de Andrade
Captaincy of Ceará	António Cardoso de Barros
Captaincy of Rio Grande	João de Barros / Aires da Cunha
Captaincy of Itamaracá	Pero Lopes de Sousa
Captaincy of Pernambuco	Duarte Coelho Pereira
Captaincy of Bahia (Baía de Todos os Santos)	Francisco Pereira Coutinho
Captaincy of Ilhéus	Jorge de Figueiredo Correia
Captaincy of Porto Seguro	Pero Campos de Tourinho
Captaincy of Espírito Santo	Vasco Fernandes Coutinho
Captaincy of São Tomé	Pero de Góis da Silveira
Captaincy of São Vicente – 1st section (from Parati to Cabo Frio)	Martim Afonso de Sousa
Captaincy of Santo Amaro (from Bertioga to Parati)	Pero Lopes de Sousa
Captaincy of São Vicente – 2nd section (from Cananéia to Bertioga)	Martim Afonso de Sousa
Captaincy of Santana (from Cananéia to Laguna)	Pero Lopes de Sousa

All but four captaincies failed, due to inadequate resources of the donees and lack of support from the Crown. Four donees failed to take possession of their lands, and four more quickly succumbed to Indians. Only four captaincies survived past 1549: São Vicente, Pernambuco, Ilhéus and Porto Seguro.

== Subordination of the Captaincies ==
The history of the captaincies is turbulent, reflecting the needs of the Kings of Portugal, a small European country, to colonize and govern an enormous expanse of South America. Throughout the early colonial era Captaincies were granted, divided, subordinated, annexed, and abandoned. In 1548 when the captaincy of Baía de Todos os Santos (Bahia) (Note: Bay of All Saints) reverted to the Crown due to the massacre, by indigenous cannibals, of its donee, Francisco Pereira Coutinho and his settlers; the King, Dom João III, established a royal governor (later a governor-general) at Bahia. At the same time Dom João rescinded some of the expansive privileges he had previously granted the donatarios (lords-proprietor). However, clearly demonstrating the crowns desire to accommodate whatever worked, Dom João instructed his first Governor to visit all the remaining captaincies, except for Pernambuco, the one singularly successful captaincy. In fact no royal governor visited Pernambuco until the Seventeenth Century. The captaincies continued to exist as governments subordinate to the royal governors, governors-general, and viceroys. All captaincies, sooner or later, reverted to being royal rather than proprietary captaincies (variously thru some failure or repurchase by the crown).

During the Philippine Dynasty, some of the captaincies attained the status of provinces with royal governors (i.e. "states"), and Portuguese Brazil thereafter was a mixture of donatary captaincies, royal captaincies and states.

=== List of post-1549 captaincies ===
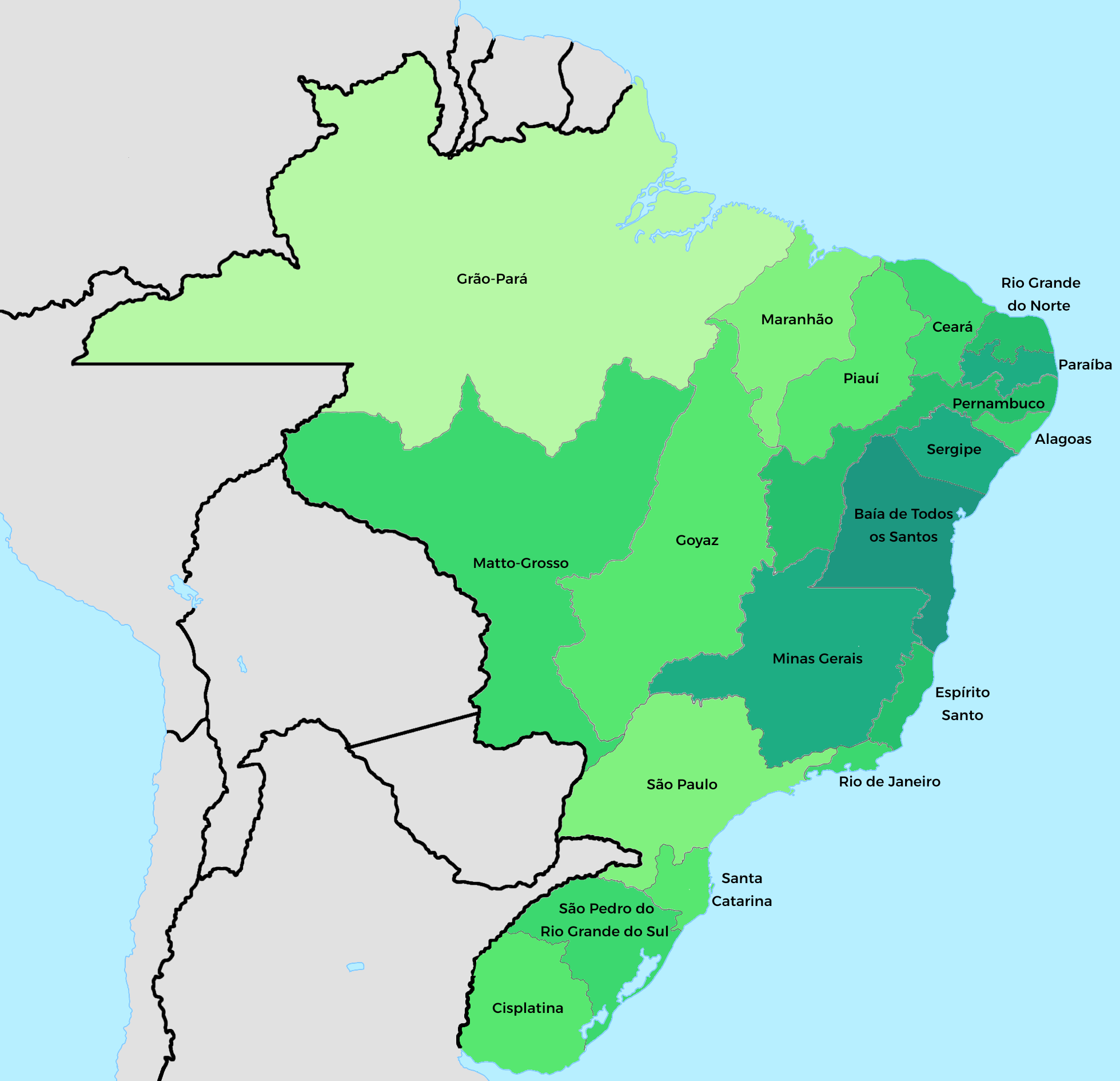
The Empire of Brazil in 1822

Some complications result from captaincies being merged and recreated with the same name, but representing altered regions. At least a few of the later captaincies were islands or capes of negligible size. Dates are of independent captaincies; in some cases, new captaincies were created as administrative divisions or subcaptaincies of existing ones before becoming fully independent (eg. Para was established as early as 1616 as a north and westward annex of Maranhão).

- Fernando de Noronha (not occupied or abandoned) 1504-1737
- Itaparica and Itamarandiba (islands), 1556, split from Bahia
- Rio de Janeiro, 1563, renamed first (northern) section of São Vicente + Paraiba do Sul(?)
- Paraguaçu, 1566, carved from Bahia
- Paraíba, 1580, created from part of Rio Grande, enlarged by acquisition of most of Itamaracá, 1585
- Rio Grande de Norte, 1597, merger of northern portion of Rio Grande, Ceara and Maranhão
- Cabo Frio, 1615, promontory in Rio de Janeiro
- Pará, ~1616 as division of Maranhão from newly incorporated territory west of the Tordesillas Line; independent in 1652
- Itapecuru (renamed Icatu after 1691), 1621
- Caeté (originally Captaincy of Vera Cruz de Gurupi), 1622, merged into Maranhão 1654
- Itanhaém, 1624
- Paranaguá, 1624
- Paraíba do Sul (originally São Tomé), 1629
- Gurupa, 1633
- Santa Cruz de Cametá, within Grão-Para on the lower Amazon, 1633 (see Cametá)
- Rio São Francisco, ~1634
- Cabo Norte, 1637, from newly incorporated territory; merged into Maranhão 1654
- Vigia, 1652
- Ilha Grande (island of Marajo), 1665, merged into Maranhão
- Xingu, 1685, within Maranhão
- Ararobá, 1690, within Pernambuco
- São Paulo and Minas de Ouro, 1709, renamed from São Vicente
- Minas Gerais, 1720, split from São Paulo and Minas de Ouro
- São Paulo, 1720, remaining after Minas Gerais split
- Mearim, 1723, within Maranhão
- Cumã, 1727, sub-captaincy split from Maranhão;
- Santa Catarina, 1739, split from São Paulo
- Goiaz, 1748, split from São Paulo
- Mato Grosso, 1748, split from São Paulo
- São José de Rio Negro (most of Amazonia region), 1755, split from Pará
- Grão-Pará, 1755, renamed portion of Pará after Rio Negro split
- Piauí, 1759, split from Maranhão
- Espírito Santo, 1799, independent from Bahia
- Rio Grande do Sul, 1760, newly incorporated territory of Rio Grande de São Pedro
- Ceará, 1799, split from Pernambuco
- Rio Grande do Norte, 1808, split from Pernambuco
- Alagoas, 1817, split from Pernambuco
- Colônia de Caiena e Guiana, 1809, annexation of French Guiana
- Sergipe, 1820, split from Bahia

== Pernambuco and São Vicente ==
The Captaincy of Pernambuco thrived due to sugarcane plantations. The Captaincy of São Vicente, called São Paulo after the city of São Paulo became its capital in 1681, obtained success through the exploration of the hinterland known as bandeiras. In 1621, these became the basis for the southeastern State of Brazil.

== Provinces of Brazil ==
In 1815, the State of Brazil was elevated to a kingdom and all existing provinces and Crown captaincies became provinces of the United Kingdom of Portugal, Brazil and the Algarves.

== Legacy of the Captaincies ==
Thirteen modern states have names of their predecessor captaincies, and several cities. The captaincies immortalized a set of Tupi-guarani place names, chiefly those of rivers and mountains.

In echoes of the feudal system of landed noblemen, the huge fazendas of the 18th and 19th centuries were allocated from the land holdings of the captaincies.

Brazil today still lives with the legacy of a plantation culture that utilized 4 million African slaves and concentrated land ownership. An elite 1.7 percent of the landowners continue to own nearly half the arable land; the top 10 percent of the nation earns half the income.

== See also ==
- Captaincy General
- Provinces of Brazil
