= Estrada Real =

Kings street

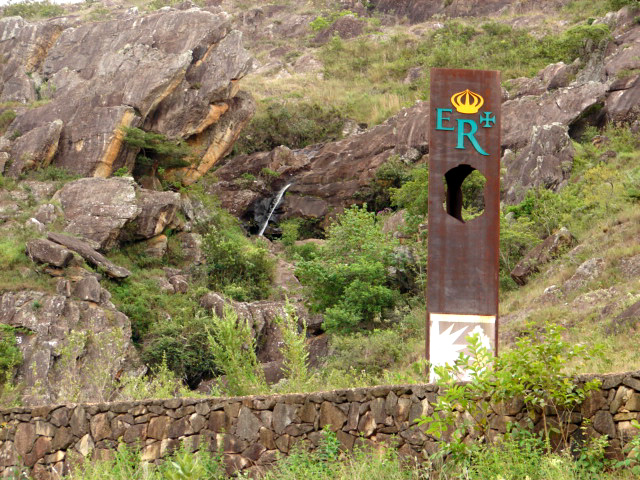
Royal Road marker in Brazil between the towns of Tiradentes and São João del-Rei, both in the state of Minas Gerais

Estrada Real (Portuguese pronunciation: [(e)sˈtɾadɐ ʁeˈaw], Royal Road) was an epithet applied to the roads built and maintained by the Portuguese Crown both in Portugal itself and in the Portuguese overseas territories.

Presently it is used to designate a set of colonial-era heritage and tourism route of more than 1,630 kilometres (1,010 mi) through Minas Gerais, Rio de Janeiro and São Paulo in Brazil

== In Brazil ==
=== Definition ===
The name refers to the land that Portuguese colonial administrators had chosen to improve communication, settlement, and the economic exploitation of Brazil’s resources and of its other colonies. To protect colonial assets from piracy and smuggling, these roads became the only authorized paths for the movement of people and goods. Opening other routes constituted a crime of lèse-majesté. It was similar to the Spanish "Caminos Reales" (Royal Paths) or Spanish colonial Puerto Rico's "Carretera Militar" (Military Roads), which ensured the flow of goods and the movement of troops in the colonies.

From the second half of the eighteenth century, there was a decline in mineral production in the captaincy of Minas Gerais, the main source of gold mining in Brazil at the time, that led to an increase of fiscal policy and local dissatisfaction with the crown which culminated in a failed independence movement in 1789. Later on, with the Independence of Brazil in the early nineteenth century, these paths became free, thus building, with the wealth provided by coffee plantations, the main thrust of urbanization in Brazil's southeast.

The modern Estrada Real tourist route is commonly divided into four main paths: the Caminho Velho, the Caminho Novo, the Caminho dos Diamantes and the Caminho do Sabarabuçu.

=== History ===
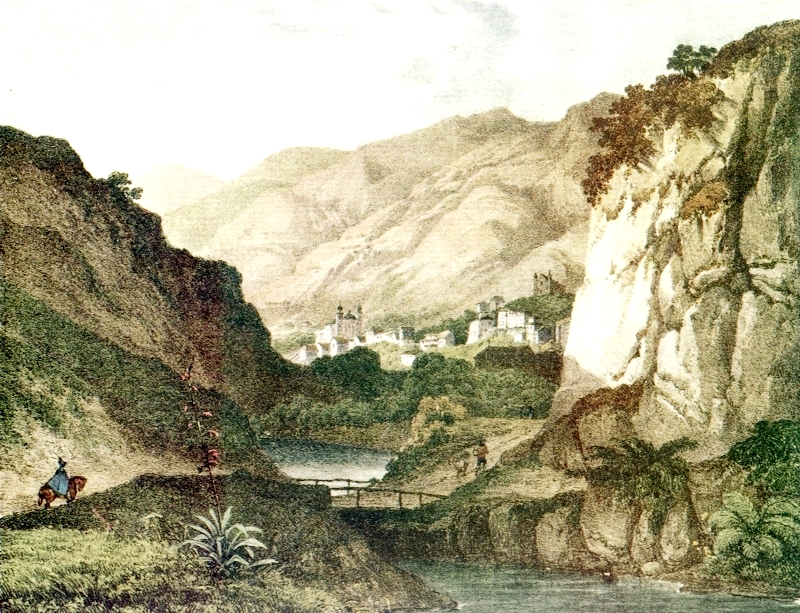
Caminho do Proença in Vila Rica, by Johann Moritz Rugendas

Beginning circa 1697, Portuguese colonists in Brazil began using slave labor to build the road. This was shortly after gold, diamonds, and other precious minerals were discovered in the present-day state of Minas Gerais. The road's purpose was to facilitate the transport of the minerals from the interior to the coast and thence to Lisbon. The original road — Caminho Velho — began in Paraty and went north through the towns of São João del-Rei, Tiradentes, Coronel Xavier Chaves, Congonhas, Itatiaia (today a district of Ouro Branco) and, ultimately, Vila Rica (today's Ouro Preto). Later, the distance to Ouro Preto was shortened by the Caminho Novo, which started in Rio de Janeiro. The road was extended northward through Mariana, Catas Altas, Santa Bárbara, Barão de Cocais, Ipoema (today a district of Itabira), Conceição do Mato Dentro, Serro, São Gonçalo do Rio das Pedras (today a district of Serro), and, at the northernmost point, Diamantina. The length of both roads combined is about 1,400 km (870 mi).

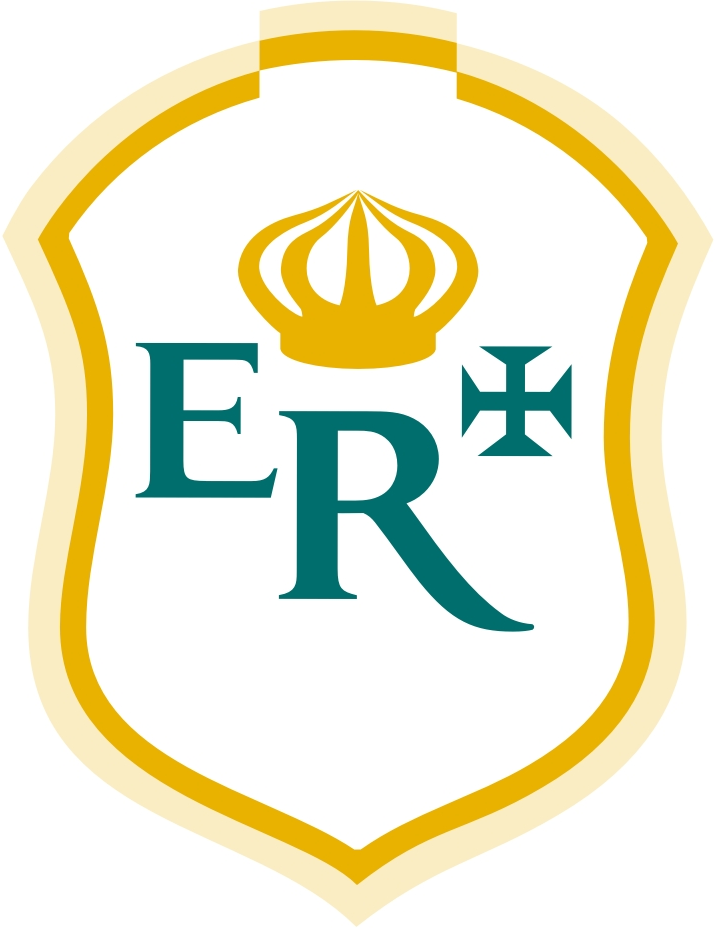
Current emblem of Estrada Real, used in Brazil

Transportation along the road was tightly controlled by agents of the crown to prevent smuggling and unauthorized movement. Goods were transported in mule trains known as tropas, led by tropeiros, mule drivers. Products from Portugal made their way up the road while minerals made their way to the coast, as manufacturing and many crops were prohibited by the crown so as to keep the region economically dependent on Portugal. Many of Brazil's hearty dishes, such as feijão tropeiro and tutu, were originally prepared by the tropeiros, who needed food that could be transported without spoiling.

The towns along the Estrada Real were opulent in the days of gold and diamonds, but by the end of the 18th century, the minerals became more scarce and the local economy declined. Recent efforts by governmental and non-governmental organizations turned the Estrada Real into a tourist route. The road is still mostly unpaved, and the towns and villages along the way appear much the way they did in the 19th century. Many colonial churches still stand in towns that have been economically stagnant for over a century. The tourism initiative is educating people to retain their traditional ways and preserve the Baroque architecture of their old churches and government buildings.

In 2023, Brazil granted the Estrada Real the title of National Monument through Law No. 14,698 of 2023.

== See also ==
- Brazilian Gold Rush
