= Captaincy of São Vicente =

1534–1709 captaincy in southern Brazil

Coordinates: 23°57′S 46°23′W

The Captaincy of São Vicente (1534–1709) was a land grant and colonial administration in the far southern part of the colonial Portuguese Empire in Colonial Brazil.

== History ==
In 1534 King John III of Portugal granted the captaincy to Martim Afonso de Sousa, a Portuguese admiral. De Sousa had founded the first two permanent Portuguese settlements in Brazil in 1532: São Vicente (near the present port of Santos) and Piratininga (later to become São Paulo).

De Sousa received two tracts of land:

- one centered on the settlement of São Vicente, extending along the coastline from Cananéia to Bertioga (within present-day São Paulo state)
- the other extended from Parati to Cabo Frio (within present-day Rio de Janeiro state).

These two tracts, separated by the Captaincy of Santo Amaro, formed the Captaincy of São Vicente.

In 1681 the São Paulo settlement succeeded São Vicente as the capital of the captaincy, and the name of the latter gradually fell into disuse.

São Vicente became the only captaincy to flourish in southern Brazil. It ultimately gave rise to São Paulo state and provided the base for the bandeirantes to expand Portuguese America west of the Tordesilhas Line.

=== Territorial evolution of the Captaincy of São Vicente (1534–1709) ===
The Captaincy of São Vicente in Southern Brazil:

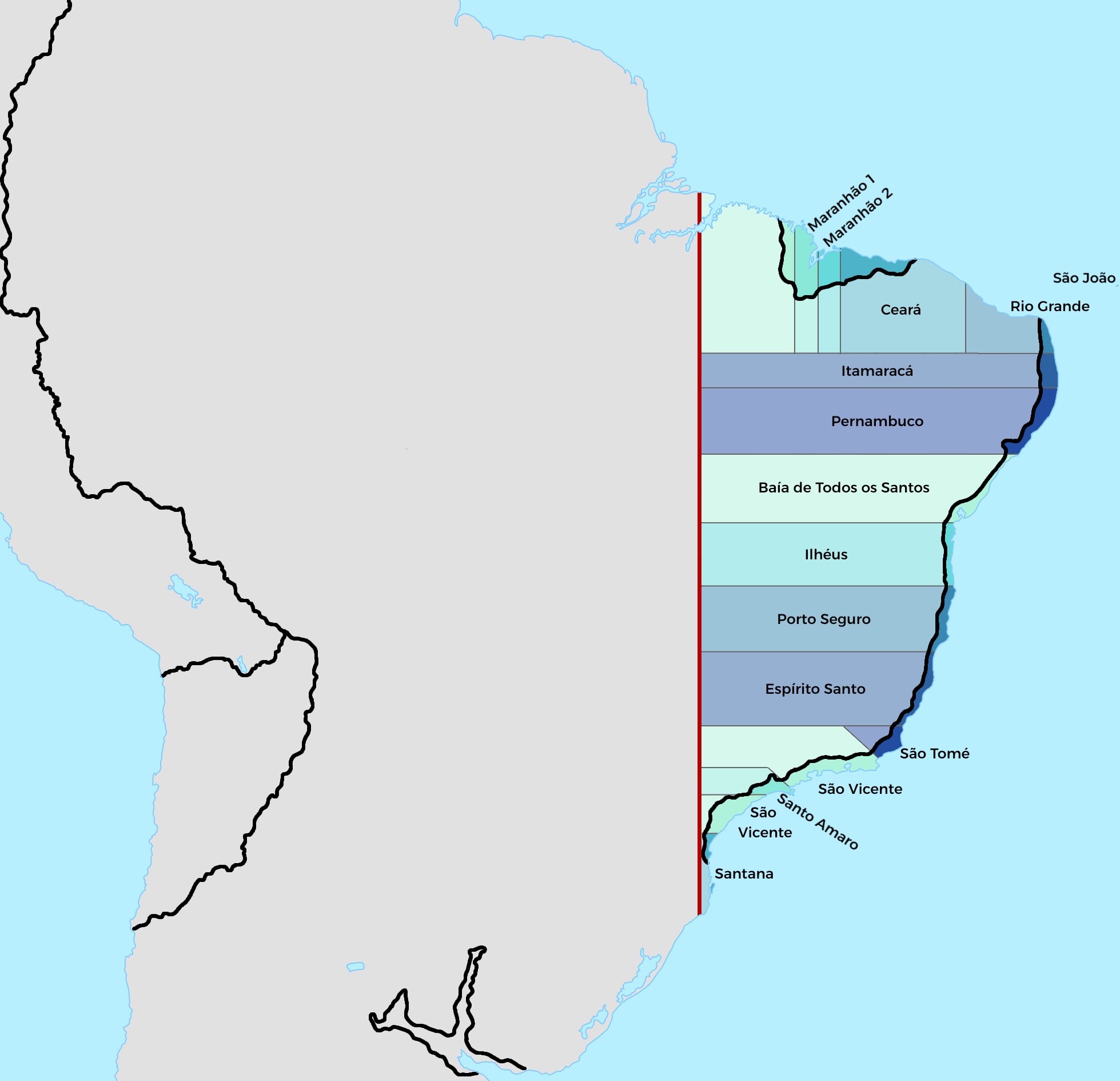
1534
Capitanias hereditárias

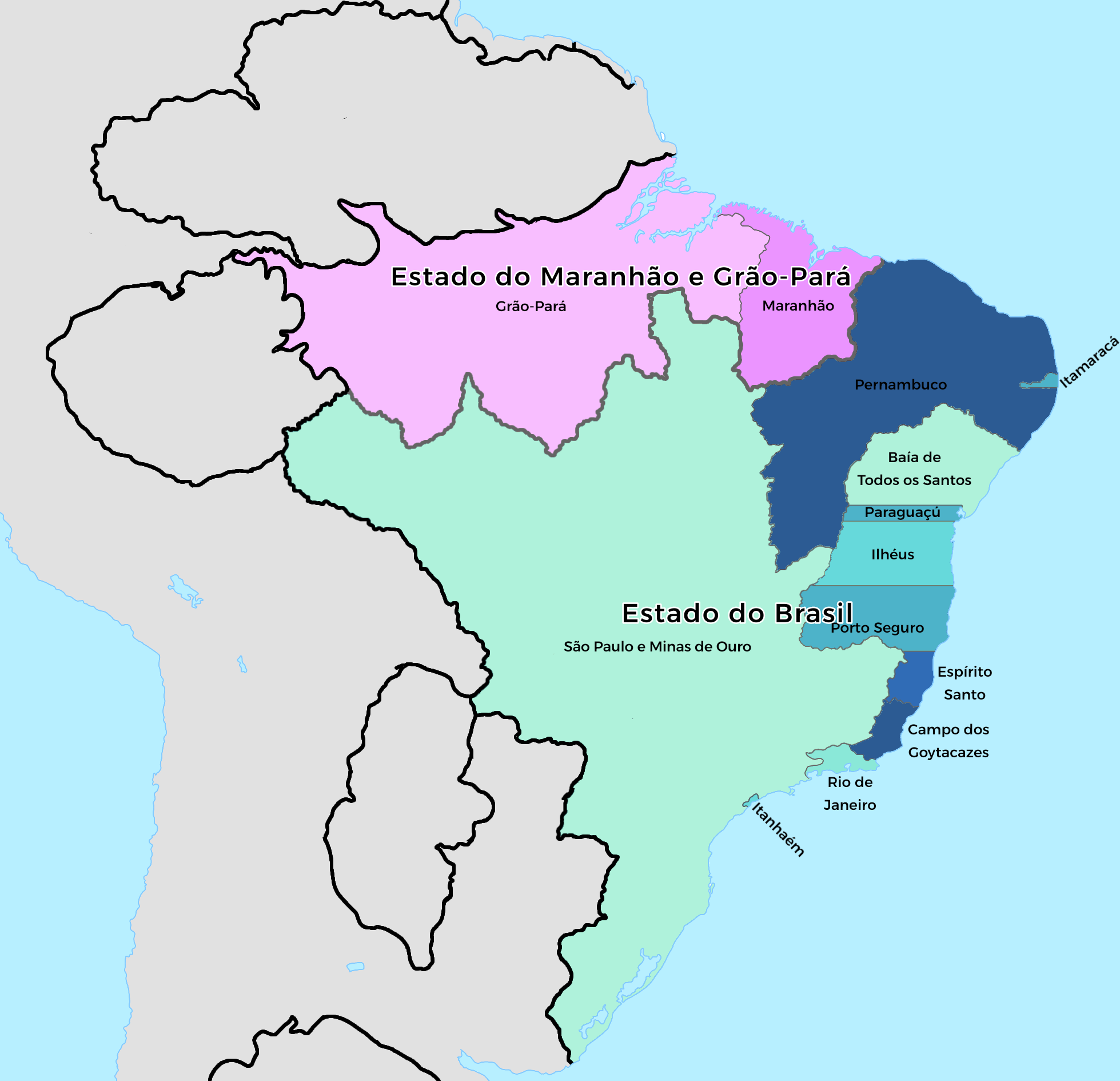
1709
São Vicente at its greatest extent.

== See also ==
- Captaincies of Brazil
- Captaincy of São Paulo
- Portuguese Colonial Brazil-related topics
