= Captaincy of Bahia =

Portuguese coat of arms of Bahia

The Captaincy of Bahia, fully the Captaincy of the Bay of All Saints (Modern Portuguese: Capitania da Baía de Todos os Santos), was a captaincy of Portuguese Brazil.

== History ==
=== Donatary Captaincy ===
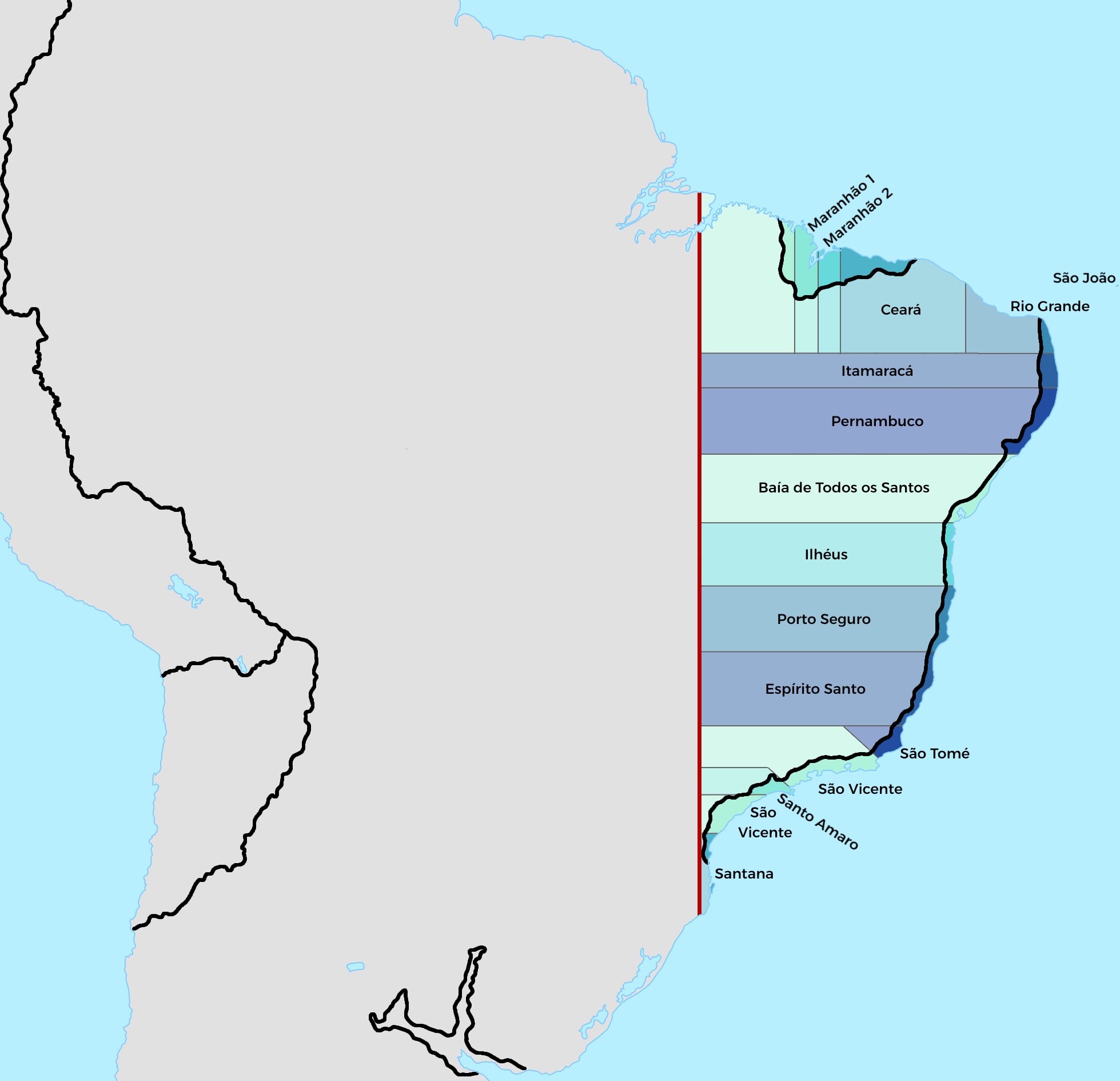
A notional reckoning of the initial donatary captaincies of colonial Brazil, including Bahia

King João III of Portugal bestowed the donatary captaincy on Francisco Pereira Coutinho on 5 March 1534 as a reward for his service at Goa. The initial grant was notionally for 50 leagues of coastline around the Bay of All Saints, from the mouth of the Rio São Francisco to the Rio Jaguariçá. In practice, the early captaincies' boundaries were not respected but the settlement was too small for it to matter.

Arriving in Brazil in late 1536, Pereira Coutinho and his men slept on their ships until they had completed the construction of about forty adobe homes, which he christened the village (povoado) of Pereira. This was located in modern Salvador's Ladeira da Barra neighborhood and was quickly elevated into a township (vila) with a municipal council (concelho), which became known as Vila Velha ("Old Town"). A fortified house, the Castelo do Pereira, was also established. The settlement was assisted by "Caramuru", a Portuguese noble (fidalgo) named Diogo Álvares Correia who had lived with the Tupinambá Indians since a shipwreck in 1510. He was granted a concession (sesmaria) authorizing the authority he already wielded over a native village of 300 huts and over a thousand men. By 1545, the colony had a sugarcane plantation with two mills (engenho,) as well as smaller cotton and tobacco fields. However, mistreatment at the hands of Pereira's settlers caused the Tupinambá to turn hostile and in that year the settlement was abandoned, with the survivors fleeing to Porto Seguro. When they returned in 1547 or '48, their ship was damaged off the southern shore of Itaparica and the survivors captured by the Indians there. Caramuru was spared but the captain was consumed by the Tupinambá in a cannibalistic feast.

=== Royal Captaincy ===
Upon the discovery of Pereira Coutinho's death, King João immediately appropriated the captaincy from its heir Manuel Pereira Coutinho in exchange for a hereditary pension of 400,000 reals. (The family was not interested in remaining in the Americas in any case.) In 1549, Tomé de Sousa was dispatched to the area as a royal governor general, founding Salvador de Bahia near the ruins of Pereira with soldiers, Jesuits, nobles, and other colonists. He was separately considered the administrator of the royal captaincy (Portuguese: capitania real) of Bahia.

On 10 November 1556, Joao III split off the separate captaincy of Itaparica for Antonio de Ataide. The concession granted to Álvaro da Costa by Governor-General Duarte da Costa on 16 January 1557 was turned into the captaincy of Paraguaçu by a royal letter of 20 November 1565. In 1580, Bahia passed with the rest of Portugal into the Iberian Union, whereby it was united with Spain and ruled by its kings from Madrid. The captaincy of Sergipe, created by King Philip II of Spain in 1590, was long subordinated to the captaincy of Bahia in the manner of one of the earlier concessions. (It was not given autonomous status under a decree of João VI of Portugal on 8 July 1820.)

In 1621, King Philip III replaced the Governorate of Brazil with the states of Brazil, still based in Bahia and now controlling the south, and the Maranhão, which was centered on São Luís and controlled what is now northern Brazil. As Spain was then prosecuting a war against the independence of the Dutch, the Dutch East and West India companies tried to conquer Brazil from them. Salvador, the capital of the captaincy, was captured and sacked by a West India Company fleet under Jacob Willekens and Piet Hein on 10 May 1624 and held until the Recapture of Bahia by a Luso-Spanish fleet in May of the next year. John Maurice's two subsequent attempts to retake the town in April and May of 1638 were unsuccessful.

The captaincy of Espirito Santo was repurchased by the crown in 1715 and administered as part of Bahia until 1809.

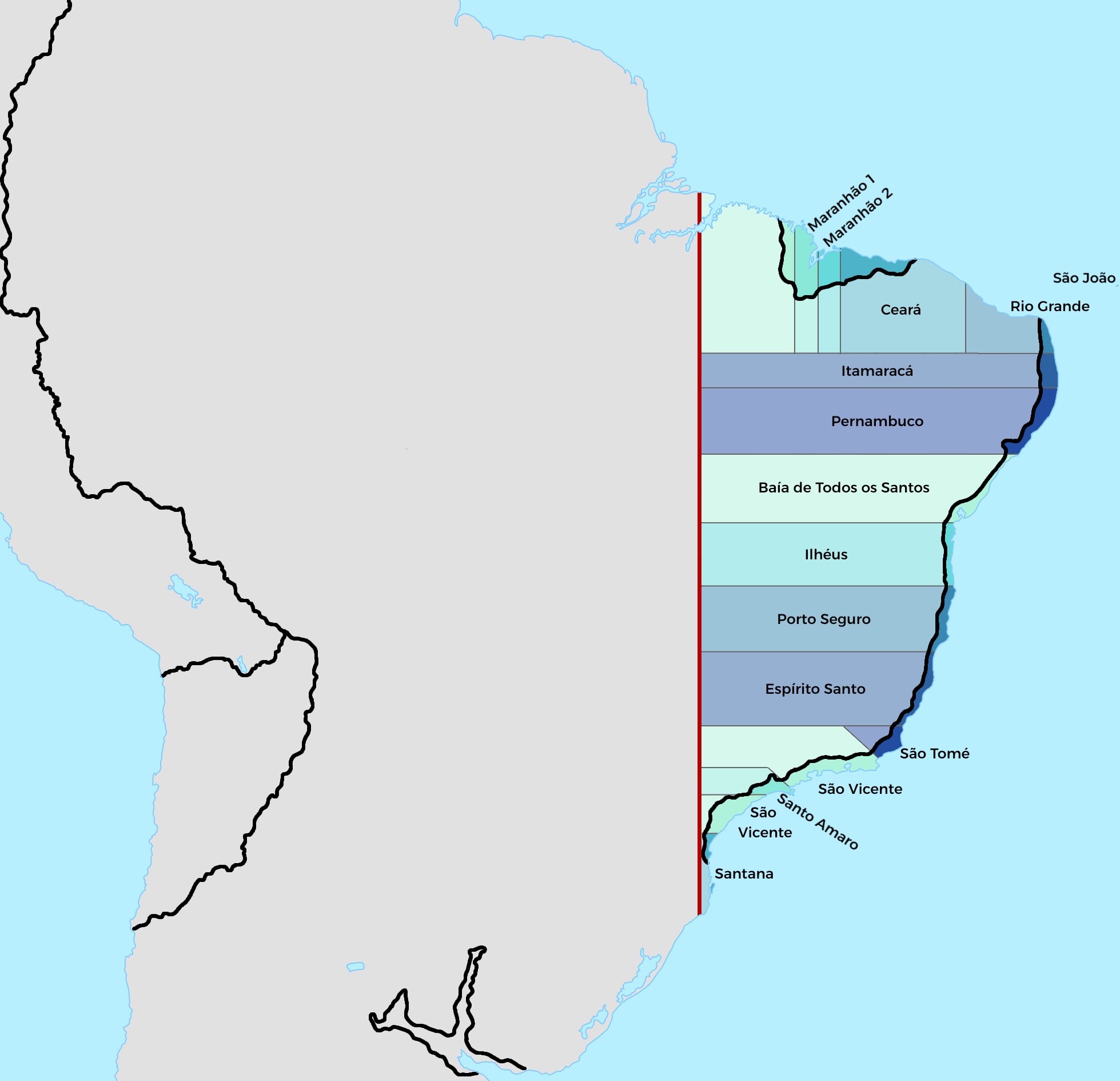
The captaincies of the Governorate of Brazil (1574), including that "of our Magistrate" at Bahia

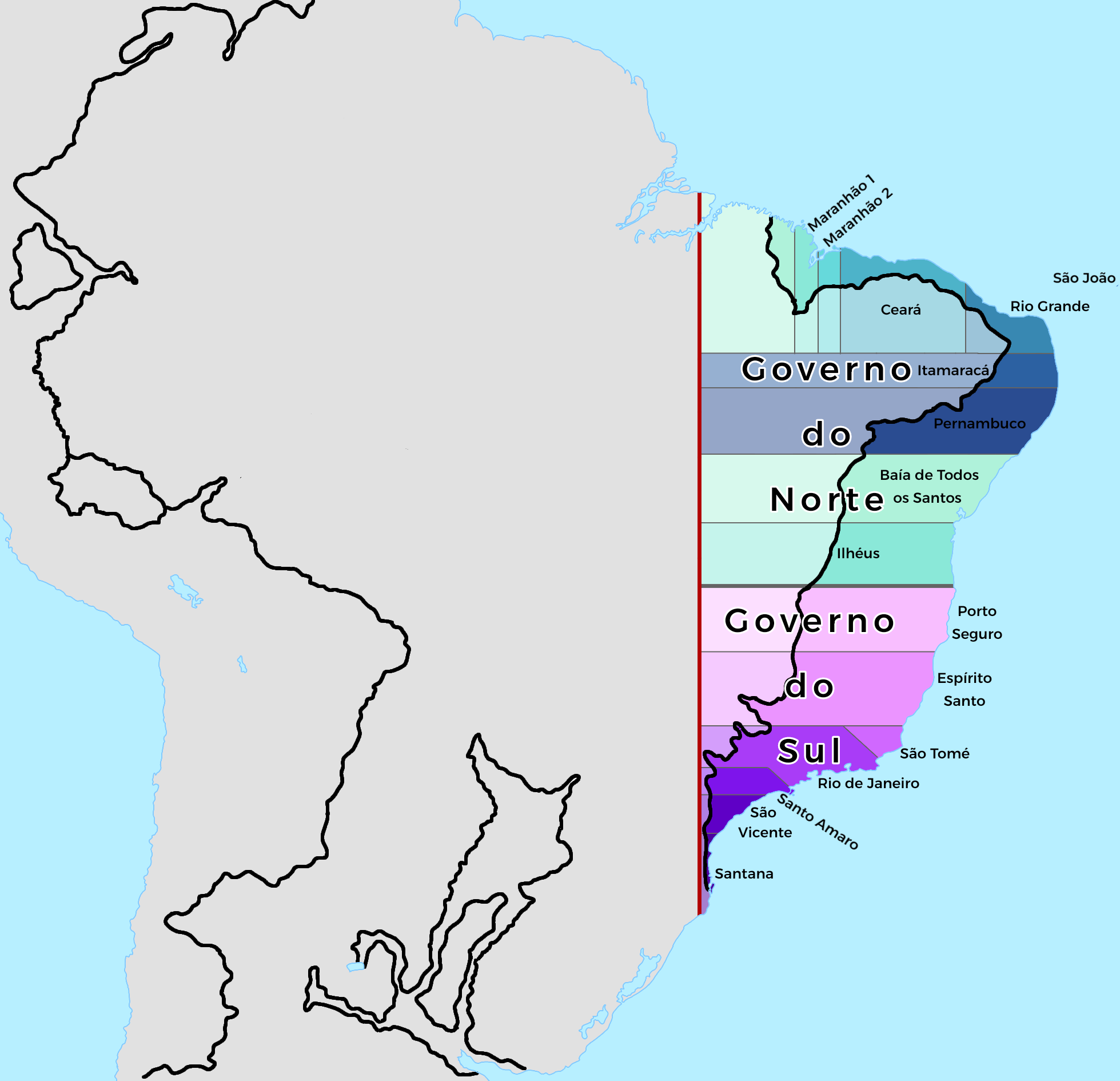
Brazil in 1574, when Salvador was the capital of the Governorate of Bahia

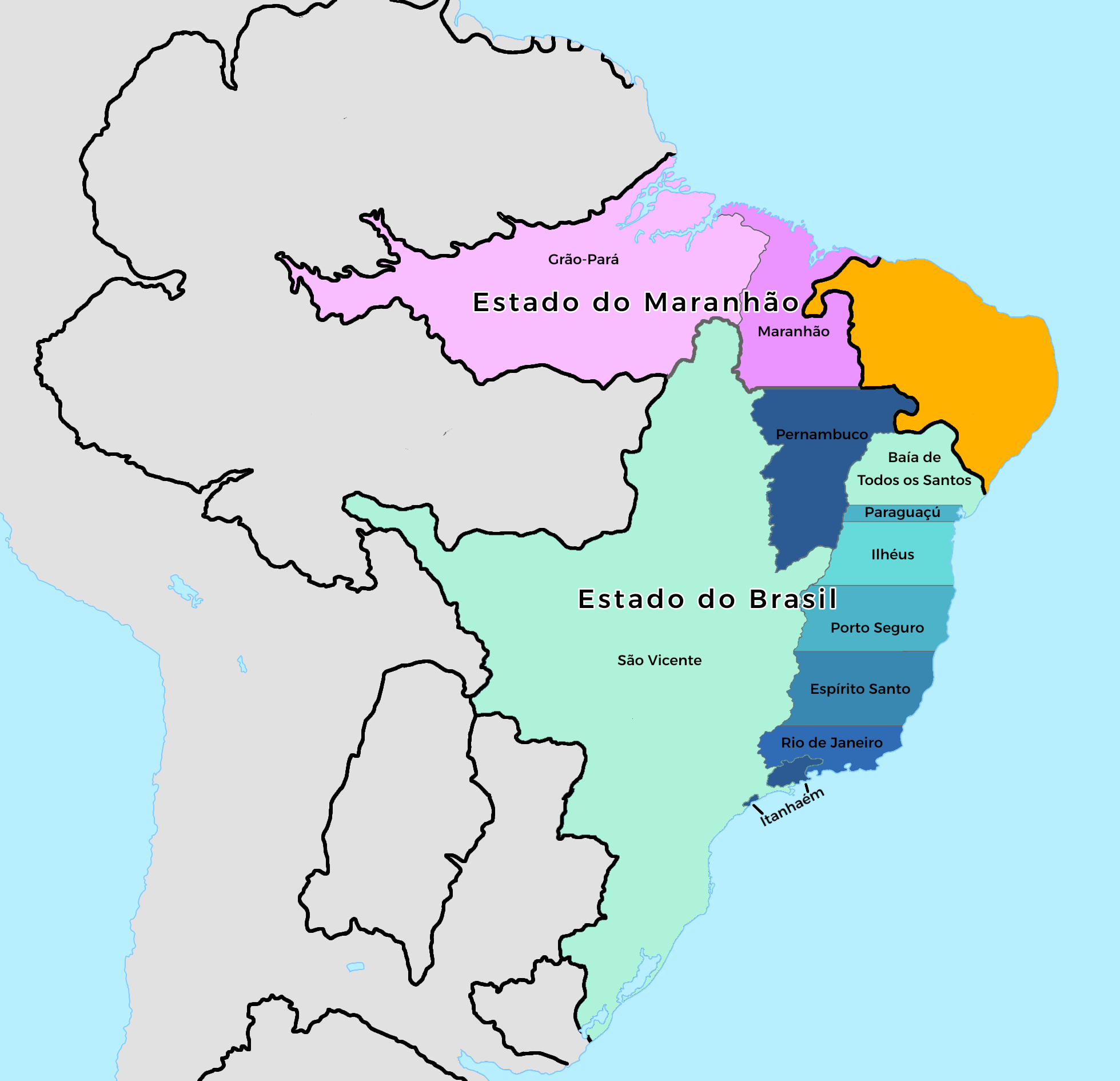
The captaincies of the State of Brazil in 1647, during the Dutch invasion

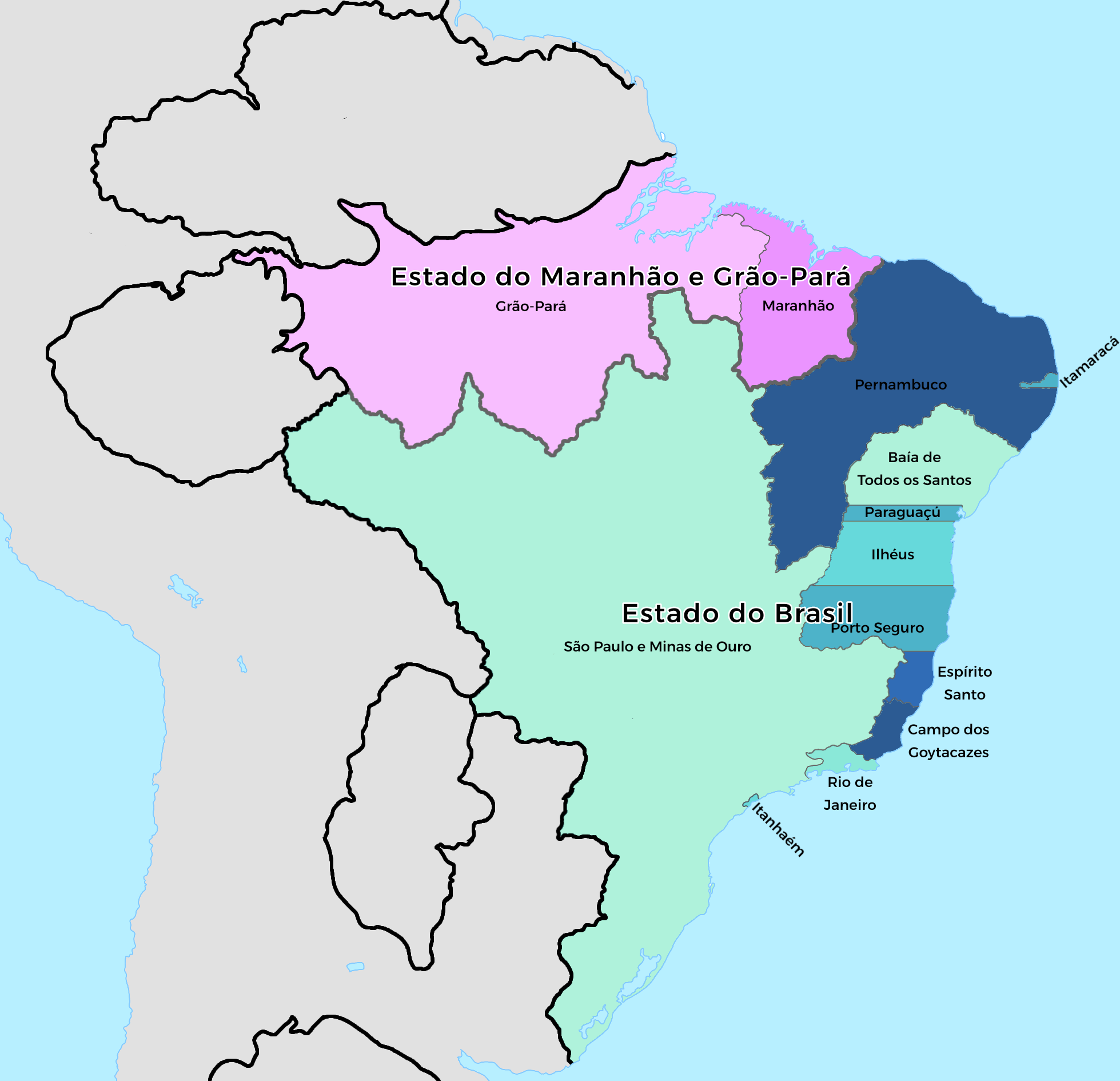
The captaincies of the State of Brazil in 1709

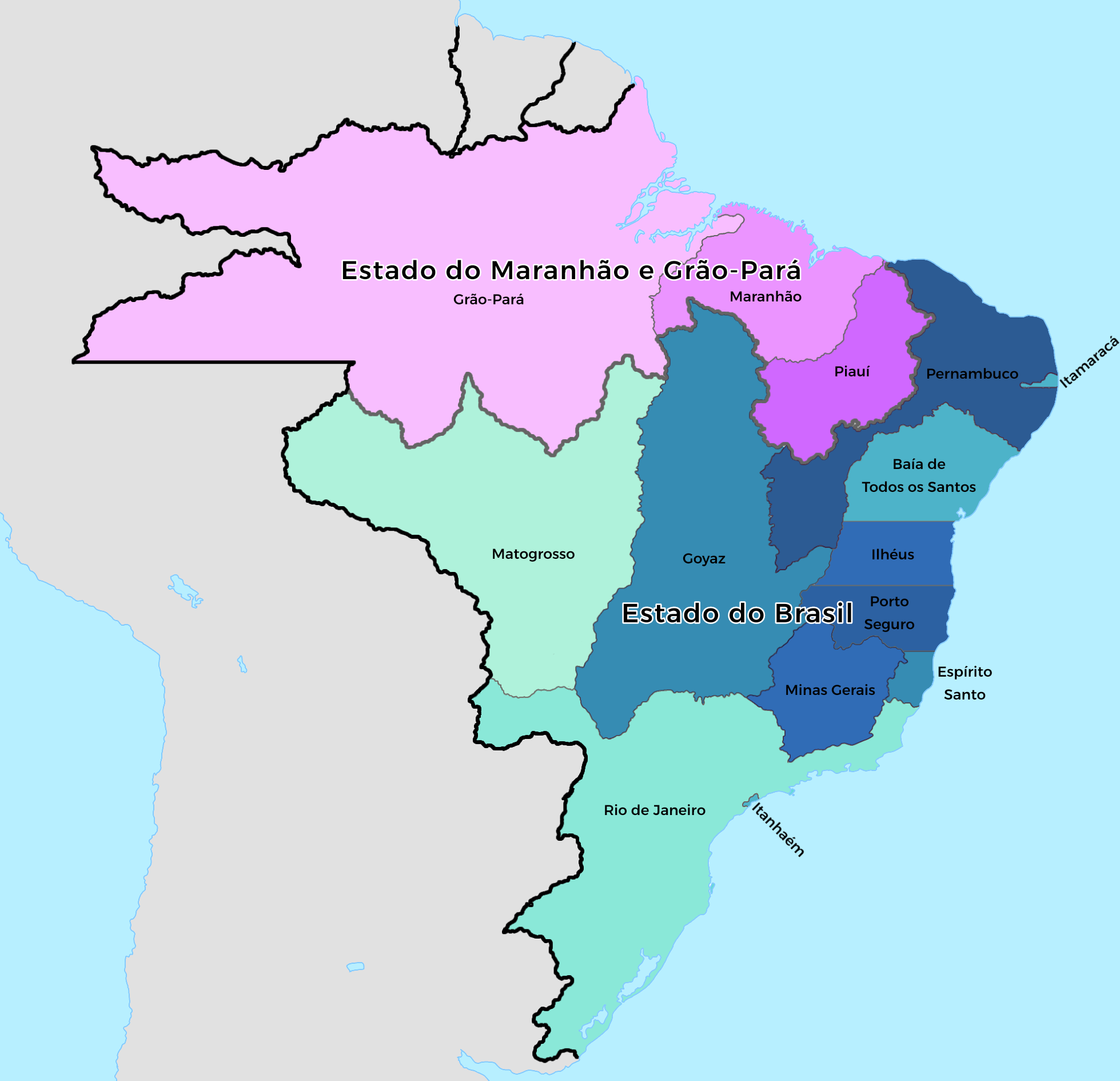
The captaincies of the Viceroyalty of Brazil in 1750

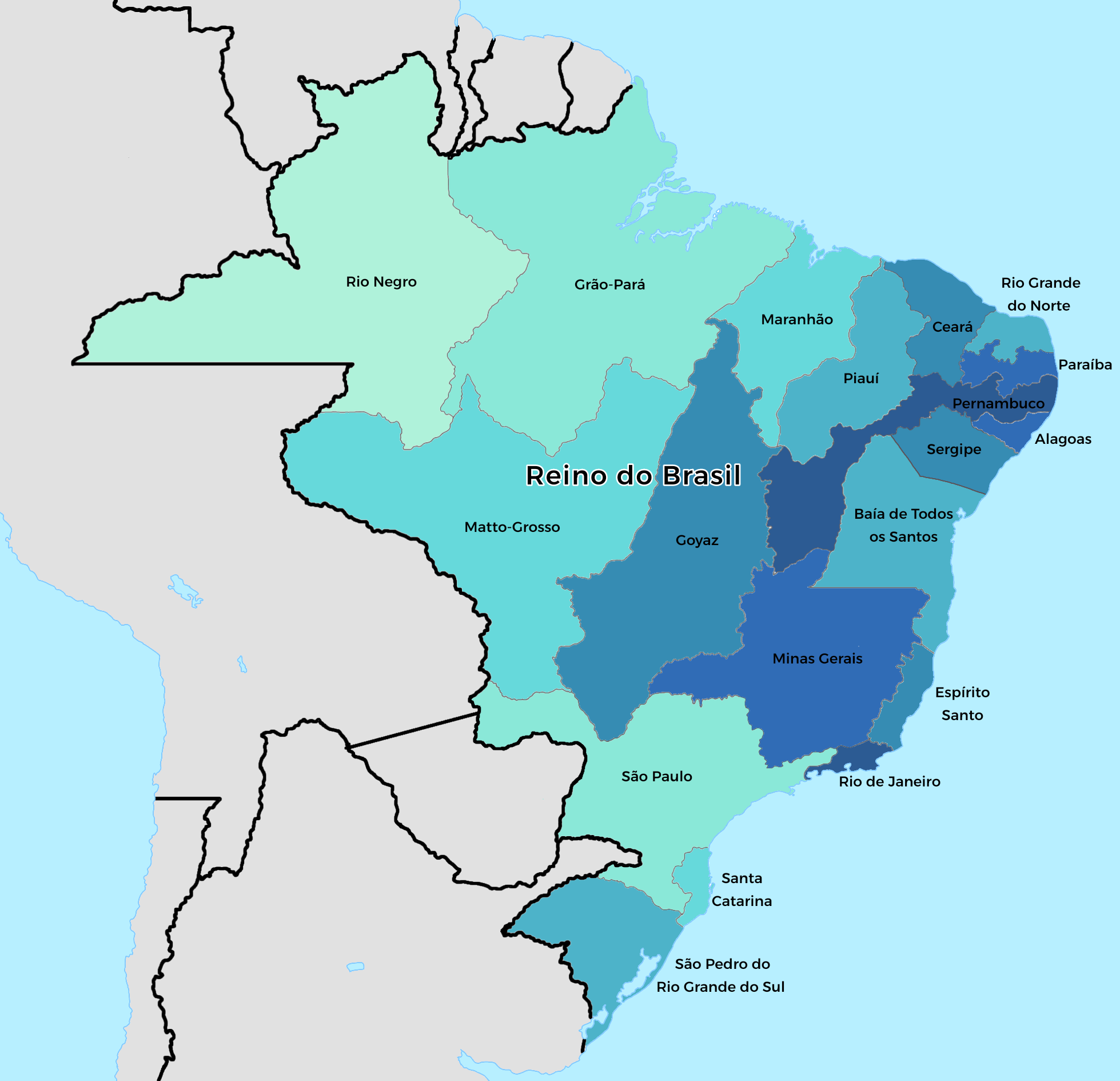
The captaincies of the Viceroyalty of Brazil in 1817

== List of the donatary captains of Bahia ==
- Francisco Pereira Coutinho (1534–1548?)
- Manuel Pereira Coutinho (c. 1548)

== See also ==
- Other Bahias
- Captaincies of Brazil, the other divisions of the country under colonial and royal rule
- Provinces of Brazil, the divisions of the country under the Empire of Brazil
- States of Brazil, the divisions of the country under the Republic of Brazil
