= Velho =

Velho is Portuguese for old, and may be a surname as well as part of a toponym. It may refer to:

== People ==
- Álvaro Velho, Portuguese sailor or soldier
- Bartolomeu Velho (d. 1568), Portuguese cartographer and cosmographer
- Domingos Jorge Velho (1641–1705), Portuguese bandeirante
- Fernão Velho (14th century), Portuguese nobleman
- Gonçalo Velho Cabral (1400–1460), Portuguese monk
- Luiz Velho (born 1956), Brazilian mathematician
- Maria Velho da Costa (1938–2020), Portuguese writer
- Nuno Velho Cabral (15th Century), Portuguese nobleman
- Ricardo Velho (born 1998), Portuguese football player
- Soccor Velho (1983–2013), Indian football player

== Places ==
- Velho River (São Paulo), Brazil
