= Captain general =

Military grade

Captain general (and its literal equivalent in several languages) is a high military rank of general officer grade, and a gubernatorial title.

== History ==
The term captain general started to appear in the 14th century, with the meaning of commander-in-chief of an army (or fleet) in the field, probably the first usage of the term general in military settings. A popular term in the 16th and 17th centuries, but with various meanings depending on the country, it became less and less used in the 18th century, usually replaced by the stand-alone term general or by field marshal; and after the end of the Napoleonic Wars it had all but disappeared in most European countries except Spain and former colonies. The terms for other ranks of general officer, such as brigadier general, (sergeant-)major general, lieutenant general, and colonel general, also came to include the designator "general" as a way of distinguishing them from similarly named field-officer and noncommissioned-officer ranks, with some languages' and nations' names for some field ranks (e.g. German Feldhauptmann, "field captain") likewise acquiring a distinguishing designator.

=== Republic of Venice ===
In the Republic of Venice, it meant the commander-in-chief in war time. The captain general of the land forces was usually a foreign mercenary or condottiere, but the Venetian navy was always entrusted to a member of the city's patriciate, who became Captain General of the Sea. It is at least documented since 1370 and was used up to the fall of the Republic of Venice in 1797.

=== Great Britain ===
From 30 June to 22 October 1513, Catherine of Aragon held the titles 'Governor of the Realm' and 'Captain General of the King's Forces' as Queen Regent of England, winning the Battle of Flodden against a Scottish invasion whilst King Henry VIII was in France fighting the Battle of the Spurs.

==== Commander-in-Chief of the Forces ====
In the mid-17th century, with the first establishment in England of something akin to a standing army, the title 'Captain General' was used (either alongside or in place of that of Commander-in-Chief of the Forces) to signify its commanding officer. In 1645, Thomas Fairfax was appointed "Captain General and Commander-in-Chief of all the armies and forces raised and to be raised ... within the Commonwealth of England". After the Restoration, King Charles II likewise designated General Monck "Captaine Generall of all our Armies and land forces and men ... in and out of our Realmes of England, Scotland and Ireland and Dominion of Wales" (he was also referred to on occasion as "Lord Generall" and "Commander in Chief of all His Majesty's Forces"). The office then remained in abeyance until 1678 when it was granted to the Duke of Monmouth, but in the following year he was deprived of this and other titles. There were no subsequent appointments until the reign of Queen Anne.

In the 18th century, the office of Captain General was held by the Duke of Marlborough (1702 to 1711), the Duke of Ormonde (1711 to 1714) and the Duke of Marlborough again (1714 to 1722). Thereafter there was no permanent Commander-in-Chief or equivalent appointed until 1744; in the following year the office of Captain General was vested in Prince William, Duke of Cumberland. Cumberland resigned in 1757; his successors in command were for the most part appointed Commander-in-Chief but not Captain General, with one exception: the last appointment of a Captain General of the Forces was that of Prince Frederick, Duke of York and Albany, in 1799.

Any distinction that there may have been at this time between the office of 'Captain General' and 'Commander-in-Chief' is unclear. One difference is that the Commander-in-Chief was appointed by commission and the Captain General by patent, which has led some to surmise that the appointment of Captain General was "one of dignity, not of power"; however, the matter is somewhat academic, for most Captains General held the appointment of Commander-in-Chief simultaneously (and from 1757 the appointment of Commanders-in-Chief was itself done by patent).

==== Other uses ====
Since the 17th century the title Captain General has been in use in England for the titular head of the Honourable Artillery Company and in Scotland for the senior officer of the Royal Company of Archers.

In 1947 the position of Colonel-in-Chief, Royal Marines, was changed by its incumbent, King George VI, to that of Captain General Royal Marines; likewise, the position of Colonel-in-Chief of the Royal Regiment of Artillery was changed by its incumbent, George VI, to Captain General.

The formal head of the Combined Cadet Force is also titled Captain General.

=== New South Wales ===
From 1787 (the year before the arrival in Australia of the First Fleet) to 1837, the Governor of New South Wales was referred to as Captain-General.

=== Prussia ===
In Prussia, a Generalkapitän was the commander of the castle guard and lifeguards.

=== United States ===
In the Thirteen United Colonies and, later, the United States of America, during the American Revolutionary War, George Washington was the "Captain-General and Commander in Chief of the Forces." George Washington is the only general in the United States to be referred to as "Captain-General" of the armed forces.

==== Connecticut ====
In Connecticut, the state Constitution of 1965 states that the Governor is also the Captain General of the Connecticut State Militia.

==== Rhode Island ====
In Rhode Island, the Governor holds two different military titles. According to Article IX, section 3 of the Rhode Island Constitution, the Governor holds the titles of "captain-general" and "Commander-in-Chief".

==== Vermont ====
The 1786 Constitution of Vermont, which became effective when Vermont was an independent country and continued in effect for two years after Vermont's admission to the Union in 1791, says "The Governor shall be captain-general and commander-in-chief of the forces of the State, but shall not command in person, except advised thereto by the Council, and then only as long as they shall approve thereof." The language remained in the 1793 Constitution of Vermont.

=== Netherlands ===
Maurice of Nassau was appointed to the office of "Captain General of the Union" (commander-in-chief of the Dutch States Army) and "Admiral General" of the Dutch Republic in 1587. This was a "confederal" office, under the States General of the Netherlands. He was also stadtholder of five of the seven provinces, which was a provincial appointive office, under the sovereign States of the several provinces. Maurice's nephew William Louis, Count of Nassau-Dillenburg was concurrently also a stadtholder (in two provinces) but he held a normal commission in the States Army. The office was not hereditary, but after 1747 only members of the House of Orange-Nassau could be appointed to it.

=== Spain ===
By the late 15th century, the title Captain General, besides being the usual meaning of commander-in-chief in the field, was also linked to the highest commander of specialized military branches (artillery, royal guards, etc.), usually signaling the independence of that particular corps.

No later than the fall of Granada (1492) the title was conferred also on officers with full jurisdiction over every person subject to fuero militar (military obligations) in a region. Those officers usually also acted as commanders for the troops and military establishments in their area and, as time passed, those duties (and the title) were mostly united in the highest civilian authority of the area. During the period of Spanish rule in much of Latin America there were several Captaincies of the Spanish Empire. The military post of captain general as highest territorial commander lasted in Spain until the early 1980s.

==== Army ====
In the late 17th or very early 18th century, a personal rank of captain general was created in the Spanish Army (and Navy) as the highest rank in the hierarchy, not unlike the Marechal de France. When wearing uniform, the kings used captain general insignia. Valeriano Weyler, Governor General of Cuba in 1896–97 during the period preceding the Spanish–American War, held the rank. Briefly abolished by the Second Spanish Republic, it was restored during the regime of Francisco Franco in 1938; Franco himself was the only officer of this rank. Later King Juan Carlos I (1975), Agustín Muñoz Grandes (1956) and Camilo Alonso Vega (1972) were promoted while on active duty; a few posthumous promotions and promotions of retired officers to this rank were also made. In 1999, the rank was reserved to the reigning monarch.

==== Navy ====
The evolution of the title in the Spanish Navy is parallel to that of the army. During the 16th and 17th century the two main naval captain general posts were Capitán-General de la Armada del Mar Océano and Capitán-General de Galeras, roughly Commander-in-Chief for the Atlantic and the Mediterranean respectively.

A peculiar usage of the rank arose in the Spanish Navy of the 16th century. A capitán-general was appointed by the king as the leader of a fleet (although the term 'squadron' is more appropriate, as most galleon fleets rarely consisted of more than a dozen vessels, not counting escorted merchantmen), with full jurisdictional powers. The fleet second-in-command was the 'almirante' (admiral), an officer appointed by the capitan-general and responsible for the seaworthiness of the squadron. One captain-general that sailed under the Spanish flag that is now well known was Ferdinand Magellan, leader of the first fleet to sail around the world.

Under the Nationalist regime of 1939–1975, the only holder of the rank of capitán general de la armada was the Caudillo, Generalísimo Francisco Franco.

==== Air force ====
The rank of Captain General of the Air Force, originally created by Franco for himself, currently is reserved for the reigning monarch.

=== Portugal ===
==== Army ====
The title was given, in 1508, to the commander-in-chief of the Ordenanças (the territorial army of the crown).

During the Portuguese Restoration War, after 1640, the "Captain-General of the Arms of the Kingdom", became the commander-in-chief of the Portuguese Army, under the direct authority of the War Council and the King. In 1762 the post of the captain-general was replaced by the title marechal-general – fieldmarshall-general.

==== Navy ====
Like in the Army, the Capitão-General da Armada Real (Captain-General of the Royal Navy) was the commander-in-chief of the Portuguese Navy in the 17th and 18th centuries.

=== France ===
The title has been only sporadically used in France. During the 17th century, and for a short while, a rank between Lieutenant General and Marshal of France of this denomination was created. The king of France was the Captain General of the Army, but was represented in the field by lieutenant generals who commanded in his absence.

=== Kingdom of Bavaria ===
In the former Kingdom of Bavaria, the generalkapitän was the leader of the royal Hartschier guard. The position was associated with the highest class ranking in the Hofrangordnung (court order of precedence).

=== Papal States ===
During the time of the Papal States the title of Captain General of the Church was given to the de facto commander-in-chief of the Papal Army. It existed parallel to the office of Gonfalonier of the Church, which was a more ceremonial position than a tactical military command position. Both offices were abolished by Pope Innocent XII and replaced with the office of Flag-bearer of the Holy Roman Church.

=== Bohemia, Poland, Lithuania and Ukraine ===
The term "Captain General" as Hetman (the word from the German Hauptmann "Capitan") is a political title from Eastern Europe, historically assigned to military commanders. It was the title of the second-highest military commander (after the monarch) in 15th- to 18th and 20th-century.

=== Siam ===
The rank Captain General (Thai: นายกองใหญ่) was used as the highest rank in Wild Tiger Corps, this rank was exclusively for King Vajiravudh but in 1915 he created rank General of the Wild Tiger Corps (Thai: นายพลเสือป่า) for members who are leaders of corps. The rank was equivalent to brigadier.

== Current usage as a military rank and dignity ==
=== Bolivia ===
In Bolivia, the President of Bolivia has the rank and dignity of Captain General as head of the Armed forces, despite being a civilian. The president is responsible for the overall command of the forces.

=== Commonwealth realms ===
In the armies of various Commonwealth realms, the term Captain General (Captain-General/capitaine-général in Canada) is generally used when describing the ceremonial head of a corps or unit. Charles III serves as the Captain General of several artillery units in these realms, including the British Royal Artillery and the Honourable Artillery Company, the Royal Australian Artillery, the Royal Regiment of Canadian Artillery, and the Royal Regiment of New Zealand Artillery. In addition to artillery units, Charles III also serves as the Captain General for the British Royal Marines.

One other appointment of Captain General is in the Royal Company of Archers (The King's Body Guard for Scotland), a position currently held by the Duke of Buccleuch.

=== Chile ===
If the Commander-in-Chief of the Army and the Head of State are reunited in the same person, they are promoted to the permanent military rank of Captain General (Spanish: capitán general). It has only happened three times in Chile's history (Bernardo O'Higgins, Ramón Freire and Augusto Pinochet). Current electoral provisions (as of 2008) forbid the Commander-in-Chief becoming president.

=== Spain ===
In Spain, the title Captain General (capitán general) is the highest military rank, and has since 1999 been exclusively borne by the Spanish monarch (currently Felipe VI).

== Administrative positions ==
The term "captain general" can also be used to translate Spanish capitán general or Portuguese capitão-general, administrative titles used in the Spanish Empire and the Portuguese Empire, especially in the Americas. Each was in charge of a captaincy.

=== In the Spanish Empire and Latin America ===
Capitán General was the military title given to the Spanish military governor of a province of the Spanish Empire, in the colonies usually also the president of the civilian audiencia (court of law).

=== In the Portuguese Empire ===
In the Portuguese Empire, a capitão-general (plural capitães-generais) was a governor of a capitania geral (captaincy general), with a higher rank than a capitão-mor (captain-major) and directly subordinated to the Crown. A captaincy general had a higher category than the simple captaincies (also referred as subaltern captaincies). Sometimes, a captaincy general included one or more subaltern captaincies. The governors of the captaincies general were usually styled "governor and captain-general", with the term "governor" referring to his administrative role and the term "captain-general" referring to his military role as commander-in-chief of the troops in his captaincy.

The title capitão-general was also associated to the roles of Governor-General or Viceroy of Portuguese India and of Brazil. Thus, in Brazil, besides the captains-generals that were governors of the several captaincies general, existed a central captain-general that was the governor-general or Viceroy.

== In fiction ==
In J. R. R. Tolkien's The Lord of the Rings, Boromir is described as "Captain-General" of the armies of Gondor.

In the Wheel of Time series by Robert Jordan, "captain-general" is the highest rank of the Ever Victorious Army of Seanchan, excepting only the rank of marshal-general, which may be temporarily assigned to a captain-general given the command of a theatre of war. In addition, captain-general is also the title of both the leader of the Queen's Guard of Andor and the head of the Green Ajah of the Aes Sedai.

In the BattleTech universe, Captain-General is the title of the military and political leader of the Free Worlds League, one of the major factions in the setting. Since the 25th century, Captains-General have been members of the Marik family in a quasi-hereditary succession. Previously, the post had been an appointed post roughly analogous to the real world position of Roman Dictator, who held power only for also long as a crisis demanding a Captain-General persisted. During the First Succession War, Resolution 288 was passed making the post permanent "for the duration of the crisis", with no end point delineated.

In Assassin's Creed: Brotherhood, Cesare Borgia is depicted in the office of Captain General of the Papal Army, a position he did in fact hold along with Gonfalonier of the Church.

In the Ring of Fire universe (created by Eric Flint), Gustav II Adolf, King of Sweden, is granted the newly created hereditary title of "Captain General of the State of Thuringia" (later known as the State of Thuringia-Franconia) at the end of the first book, entitled '1632'. This was a recognition of his authority over Thuringian territory as an integral part of the "Confederated Principalities of Europe", a Protestant substitute for the Holy Roman Empire which he created, while allowing the Thuringian government to continue to claim that it was a republic and not a monarchy.

In the Warhammer 40,000 universe, the title Captain-General of the Adeptus Custodes is given to the head of the Adeptus Custodes, the elite 10,000 genetically engineered supersoldiers who acted as the God-Emperor of Mankind's elite bodyguard, joining him in battle during the Great Crusade and Horus Heresy. During the Horus Heresy, the Captain-General was Constantin Valdor, called the "Emperor's Spear". In the aftermath, the Captain-General was granted a position as a High Lord of Terra and ultimate authority over who could approach the Golden Throne, where the Emperor was interred after his battle with the Warmaster Horus.

== See also ==
- Colonel-in-Chief
- Captain-major
- Captaincy, an administrative division in the Spanish and Portuguese colonial empires, governed by a captain general
- Five-star rank
- General, a description of the various general officer ranks, including the full general which is the successor to captain general
- General Captaincy
- Generalissimo
- List of senior officers of the British Army
- Queen Elizabeth II's honorary military positions
