= Captaincy of Sergipe =

Captaincy of colonial Brazil

Captaincy of Sergipe-del-Rei Capitania de Sergipe
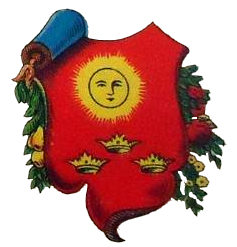
- Coat of arms

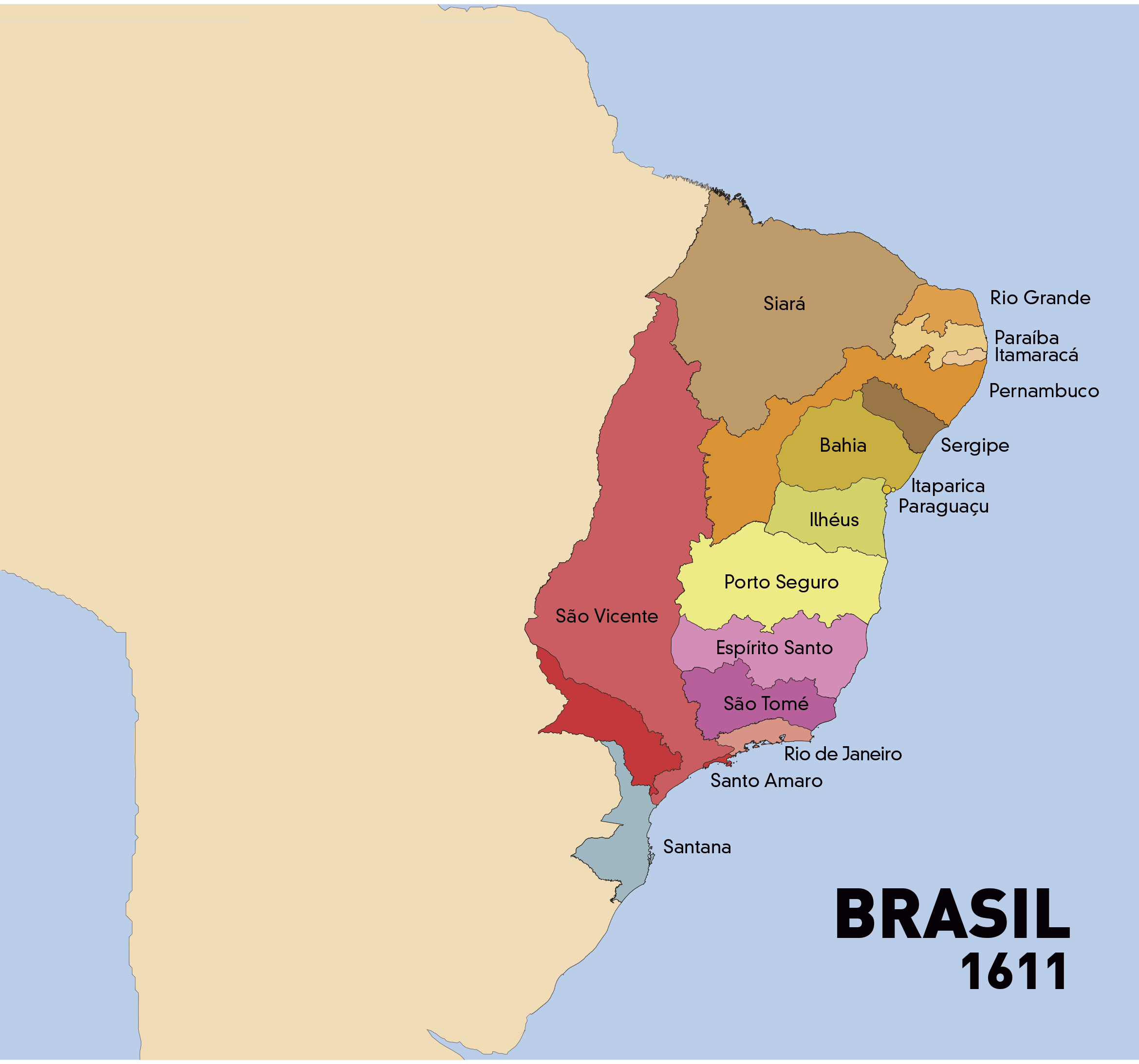
- Map of Brazil in 1611, Sergipe colored in dark brown.
- Status: Dependent territory
- Capital: São Cristóvão
- Other languages: Portuguese
- Religion: Roman Catholicism
- Demonym: Sergipano
- Government: Absolute monarchy
  - 1590 - ?: Cristóvão de Barros
- History
  - Established: 1590
  - Disestablished: 1821
Preceded by	Succeeded by
Tupinambá people; Kariri people	Province of Sergipe
- Today part of: Brazil

The Captaincy of Sergipe-del-Rei, also known as Sergipe, was a captaincy of colonial Brazil created in 1590 by King Felipe II of Spain, then ruler of Portugal under the Iberian Union. The captaincy was under direct subordination of the Captaincy of Bahia de Todos os Santos, which housed the capital of Brazil at the time, Salvador. Sergipe-del-Rei had around double the size of the modern state of Sergipe, extending well into the Sertão and reaching the region of Juazeiro in the west. Cristóvão de Barros was the first governor of the captaincy.

The captaincy became autonomous on 8 July 1820 under a decree of King João VI. The first governor of the autonomous captaincy was Carlos César Burlamaqui.

Less than a year later, on 28 February 1821, the captaincy was elevated to the status of province, and later under the administration of the First Brazilian Republic to the status of state.
