= Pedro Soares de Sousa =

- Pero Soares de Sousa

3rd Donatary-Captain of Santa Maria
- Monarchs: Sebastian; Henry
- Preceded by: João Soares de Albergaria
- Succeeded by: Pedro Soares de Sousa
- Constituency: Santa Maria

Personal details
- Born: Pedro Soares de Sousa
- Citizenship: Kingdom of Portugal
- Relations: Parents
- Nickname: Pero Soares de Sousa

Pedro Soares de Sousa, also known as Pero Soares de Sousa exercised the role of the third Donatary-Captain for the island of Santa Maria, between 1571 and 1573 (he was preceded in his post by João de Marvão, as the lieutenant of João Soares de Sousa), as well as between 1576 and 1580 and succeeded by Jerónimo Coutinho. He should not be confused with his descendant and seventh Donatary-Captain of Santa Maria, who in a testament dated 12 February 1634, referred to his 1616 ascendancy to the stewardship of Santa Maria.

== Biography ==
He was the son of João Soares de Sousa and Guiomar da Cunha (daughter of Francisco da Cunha de Albuquerque and Brites da Câmara, cousins of Afonso de Albuquerque).

Raised at Corte, he was known as a man of character and charity, as was his father. He was a knight in the Order of Christ and commander of São Pedro do Sul.

While still young and single he had a daughter, Concórdia de Sousa, who became a nun, taking on the name Concórdia dos Anjos.

On the island of Madeira, he married Beatriz de Morais, daughter of João de Morais and Catarina Fernandes, bearing five children:

- João Soares de Sousa (c. 1560 -?), a monk in the Order of Saint Jerome (or Hieronymites);
- António Soares, who departed for India;
- Henrique de Sousa, who later died;
- Brás Soares de Sousa (1570–1634) 5th Donatary-Captain, who married Doroteia de Melo;
- Ana de São João, who became a nun in the Convent of Nossa Senhora da Esperança, in Ponta Delgada.

=== Donatary-Captain ===
The island of Santa Maria was attacked by French corsairs in 1576; a squadron of Gauls, that included three boats (a galleon, a carrack and a zabra) disembarked with an armed force of arcabuzes. After defeating local combatants, the French set Vila do Porto aflame. Pedro Soares de Sousa, in order to reinforce the defense, solicited his brother-in-law (Rodrigo de Baeça), who petitioned the Donatary-Captain of São Miguel (D. Manuel da Câmara), who immediately dispatched men and troops under the command of Sergeant-major Simão do Quental. Reinforced by these men, and following several days of sacks and destruction, the corsairs were defeated near the Church of São Antão, and reembarked, abandoning the island. But, even before taking flight the pirates had forced a payment of 50 cows, 20 hogs and 30 rams, so that they did not set fire to the village. It is unclear whether the ransom was paid, since the destruction of Vila do Porto still occurred. During the course of the battle, a gunshot killed Manuel de Sousa, son of João Soares de Sousa. Matias Nuno Velho and Cristóvão Vaz Velho were nominated by the captain to lead the Mariense counterattack, that forced back the enemy who began setting the homes ablaze. Meanwhile, other boats disembarked and took Vila do Porto, motivating the reinforcements from São Miguel. In two days arms and munitions, disembarked in Santana, permitting a group of 250 men to take the Vila. Vila do Porto was sacked during the next three days and fire-bombed. On the third day, 200 men from São Miguel, under the command of Francisco Arruda da Costa arrived, but the French were warned by a runaway African slave.
