= Captaincies of the Portuguese Empire =

Former territorial division and hereditary lordship

The captaincies (Portuguese: capitanias) were the socio-administrative territorial divisions and hereditary lordships established initially by Henry the Navigator, as part of the Donatário system in order to settle and developed the Portuguese overseas empire. Pioneered on the island of Madeira and institutionalized in the archipelago of the Azores, the captaincy system was eventually adapted to the New World.

== Captaincies ==
The prince and his successors (the Donatários) remained on the mainland, owing to their responsibilities related to the Royal Household, during the epic period of trans-Atlantic exploration. When the King constituted and bestowed the Donatary system, he never specifically thought of sending his donatários to the archipelagos. Before the discovery of Brazil (1522), the captaincy system already operated in the Atlantic possessions of Madeira and the Azores, in addition other islands and settlements along the African coast.

=== Africa ===
Portuguese possessions in Africa were organized into captaincies. The Captaincy of Mina (Capitania da Mina) was located on the Costa da Mina between Cape Palmas to the Volta River and administered from Elmina Castle. The Captaincy of São Tomé (Capitania de São Tomé) was located between the Volta River and the Congo river and administered from Fort São Sebastião on São Tomé Island.

=== Azores ===
Following the model established on Madeira, the archipelago was divided into various captaincies in order to encourage settlement and development of the islands. The creation and development of the captaincy was neither consistent nor uniform throughout the islands of the Azores, but reflected the dedication of each donatary-captain in the endeavour. Gonçalo Velho Cabral was nominated the first Donatary-Captain in the Azores, following his discovery and settlement of Santa Maria. After constructing a few houses, the first Portuguese settlers under his authority spread out from their beachheads, naming these settlements and landmarks in their dominion. Many of the topological references on the islands are associated with these early settlers, who raised cattle and goats and cultivated wheat and vineyards using the fertile volcanic lands.

By the 16th century, eight similar captaincies had developed: these captaincies included São Miguel, Santa Maria, Graciosa, São Jorge, Praia (Terceira), Angra (Terceira), Faial-Pico and Flores-Corvo. Each captaincy evolved according to their captains' actions or initiatives. Although most islands evolved into their own captaincy, there were exceptions, such as the island of Terceira, which was divided into two captaincies. In comparison, the islands of Faial and Pico which were originally intended to be developed as two separate captaincies, but were placed in the charge of Josse van Huerter, who controlled neighbouring Faial. Likewise, São Miguel and Santa Maria were once one dominion, but Gonçalo Velho Cabral sold his stake in São Miguel to Rui Gonçalves da Câmara for two thousand cruzados and a quantity of sugar. As he grew old, Velho Cabral abandoned his captaincy and returned to Lisbon in 1460, leaving his nephew João Soares de Albergaria in charge of his captaincy. In later years, the captains of the Azores oscillated between living in their dominions or working as caretakers from Lisbon, and leaving in the archipelago their own lieutenants, councillors (Portuguese: ouvidores) and magistrates. The captains were responsible for fermenting interest in the new colonies and facilitating their settlement, which they achieved primarily through the influx of poor peoples from northern and southern regions of Portugal. The King also conceded concessions in these captaincies to foreigners (such as Van Huerter) who showed interest in developing their donations, by maintaining the Portuguese dominion of the territory and exporting valuable goods to the kingdom.

=== Brazil ===
Having succeeded with the administration of Madeira and the Azores to impose a social order, King John III applied the same structure to consolidate power in the Terra de Santa Cruz (Land of the Holy Cross). In Brazil, each captaincy consisted of a portion of land originally 50 leagues wide (but in practice varying considerably) along the Brazilian coast and extending inland to the line established by the Treaty of Tordesillas (1494), which divided Portuguese and Spanish colonial possessions. Each was given to a single capitão-mor (Captain-major) or capitão-donatário (Donatary-Captain), a Portuguese who might or might not have been a member of the aristocracy. They consisted of large, geometrically straight strips of land, running along parallel lines to the Equator from the Atlantic coast to the Tordesilhas Line defined by King John III of Portugal in 1534, in a treaty with Spain.

The difficulty of governing large territories meant that by 1549, only four captaincies remained viable (from a total of 15 captaincies created): the Captaincy of Pernambuco (granted to Duarte Coelho Pereira), the Captaincy of São Vicente (granted to Martim Afonso de Sousa), the Captaincy of Ilheus and the Captaincy of Porto Seguro. In order to save the collapsing colonies of Brazil, in 1549, John III sent Governor-General Tomé de Sousa and Jesuits under the direction of Manuel da Nóbrega to the colonies. Under their discipline, and later the governorship of Governor-General, Mem de Sá (1557–72), the colonies began to reverse the unworkable policies: by 1580, Brazil had become an economically viable colony. Over time, the Brazilian donatários were replaced by royal administrators, until the system was abolished by 1754.

== See also ==
- Captaincy
- Captaincies of the Spanish Empire
- Portuguese Empire
