= General Captaincy =

Administrative division of the Spanish and Portuguese empires, underneath a viceroyalty

The Captaincy General was a division of a viceroyalty in Spanish colonial administration. Captaincies general were established districts that were under threat from foreign invasion or attack from indigenous peoples. Their governors were the Captains general.

Spanish captaincies general, on account of their independence and distance from the crown, became virtual viceroyalties, having a direct relationship with the king and the Council of the Indies, in Madrid. (Note: According to historian Antonio Jimenez Estrella, of Department of Modern History and Latin at the University of Granada, Spain, from the perspective of institutional history, of power and of power elites, the Captaincy General was, at least during the Mendoza period (16th century), a body territorial, political, governmental and, to some extent, fiscal, endowed with powers that went far beyond military power that will be presupposed in principle.)

== See also ==
- Captain general
- Spanish Empire
- Captaincies of the Spanish Empire
