= Gonçalo Velho Cabral =

Portuguese monk and explorer

Gonçalo Velho
- Gonçalo Velho Cabral
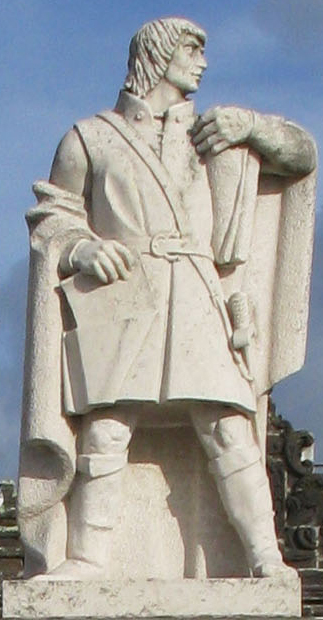
- Statue of Goncalo Velho Cabral alongside the city gates in Ponta Delgada, on the island of São Miguel (Azores), Portugal

1st Donatary-Captain of the Islands of Santa Maria and São Miguel
- In office 1439–1461
- Monarchs: John I Edward; Alphonso V
- Succeeded by: João Soares de Albergaria
- Constituency: Santa Maria and São Miguel

1st Commander of the Islands of the Azores

Personal details
- Born: 1400
- Died: 1460 (aged 59–60)
- Citizenship: Kingdom of Portugal
- Other political affiliations: Brites Godins; Branca de Sousa Falcão
- Relations: Parents: Fernão Velho; Maria Álvares Cabral

Military service
- Allegiance: Kingdom of Portugal
- Commands: Master of Pias, Beselga and Cardiga; Commander of Almourol Castle

Gonçalo Velho Cabral (c. 1400 – c. 1460) was a Portuguese monk and Commander in the Order of Christ, explorer (credited with the discovery of the Formigas, the re-discovery of the islands of Santa Maria and São Miguel in the Azores) and hereditary landowner responsible for administering Crown lands on the same islands, during the Portuguese Age of Discovery.

== Biography ==
=== Early life ===
He was son of Fernão Velho, Lord and Alcaide of Veleda, and his wife Maria Álvares Cabral (great-aunt of Pedro Álvares Cabral). His siblings Álvaro Velho Cabral, Teresa Velho Cabral, wife of Fernão Soares de Albergaria, and Violante Velho Cabral, wife of Diogo Gonçalves de Travassos also established settlements in the Azores with their families. Although referenced as Gonçalo Velho Cabral in most modern biographies, he is generally referred to as Gonçalo Velho in historical documents.

=== Explorer ===
In 1431, Gonçalo Velho was in the Vila de Tancos, along the Tagus River, when he received a summons from the Prince Henry, Governor of the Order of Christ, who ordered him to depart from Sagres in a caravel, with instructions to navigate to the western sea, and to "discover some land, [and] return with notice". This first voyage was made to determine the location of "islands" first identified by the Portuguese pilot Diogo de Silves, in 1427. Although the noted chronicler Gaspar Frutuoso has attributed to Gonçalo Velho Cabral the discovery of the seven islands of the Azores, modern historiographer contest this record, limiting his discoveries to the eastern islands alone. In 1431, with less than a few days of travel, Gonçalo Velho discovered a scattering of rocky outcroppings, which he examined and were later named the "Formigas". He quickly returned to Sagres, probably due to bad weather.

The following year, and during the reign of his brother (King D. Duarte) the Infante, D. Henrique, founded a nautical school in the provincial village of Sagres. Gonçalo Velho Cabral was one of the mariners and monks, in the devotion to the Virgin Mary that worked for the Infante. On his orders, Cabral was sent, once again, to search the Ocean Sea to discover new territories for the Portuguese Crown, promising to name the first island to the Virgin. Gonçalo Velho Cabral scanned maps and nautical charts for days while at sea, noting the currents and wind directions, during several nights, through storms and gales in search of these mythical lands identified by the Greeks outside the Pillars of Hercules.

Finally, on the morning of 15 August (the Feast day of the Assumption of the Virgin Mary), a supposedly calm, warm and clear day, the mariners and seamen could see for large distances. In the distance, though, the mate in the Crow's nest could see along the horizon a cloudy form, which progressively grew in dimensions and darkened, taken on a distinctive form. Finally, when the seaman realized beyond doubt, he yelled down to the crew, Terra à vista! (Land in sight!). As was the custom, Gonçalo Velho Cabral and his crew began their day with morning mass, benedictions and oratory to God and the Virgin Mary, to help them on their journey and to request their assistance in finding land. As the legend suggests, as the seaman yelled out his discovery the crew was praying the Ave Maria and were just pronouncing "Santa Maria" when the cry was heard. The commander considered it a miracle and, remembering the promise he had made, named the island as Santa Maria.

=== Donatary-Captain ===
With his crew he disembarked on a small beach in the north-western part of the island, which he named Lobos (later known as Ponte dos Cabestrantes) owing to the existence of many Eared seals (from the Portuguese for lobos-marinhos). As was the obligation, the Captain ordered the release of herd animals on the island for future colonization, a point that was later repeated in successive voyages through the archipelago's islands. His group circled and explored the island, examining the forested interior, before finally returning to continental Portugal. Cabral sent with him various canisters of earth and water to give the Infante, including examples of the woods unfamiliar to them in Europe.

The Infante received these "gifts" in 1432, and immediately ordered that herds be sent to the island, while he organized a plan. For his discovery, Gonçalo Velho was given the hereditary fief (Portuguese: capitania) of the island of Santa Maria. In 1432, the Infante Henry, upon receiving notice of a mystical island to the north of Santa Maria, sent orders to Gonçalo Velho to explore the waters and relate any discovery. On 3 April 1443, King Afonso V of Portugal, on the request of the Henry the Navigator, had bestowed on Gonçalo Velho the title of Commander of the Islands of the Azores. Cabral had organized a settlement of essentially familial relations, who would arrive on the island of Santa Maria in the summer of 1435. It was during Henry's encounter with Velho Cabral that notice of the discovery to the north of Santa Maria was transmitted to the Prince.

On his return, Gonçalo Velho and his crew made port in Praia dos Lobos on Santa Maria before embarking; Cabral and his Algarvean sailors eventually discovered a large island on 8 May 1444. On this first expedition, the crew ported in the small islet (today near Vila Franca do Campo) naming the large island in honour of the apparition of the archangel Michael (or São Miguel. In a secondary expedition the captain investigated the northern coast of the island, before landing at the mouth of a large ravine in the southeast corner of the island, that settlers would eventually name Povoação Velha (old settlement). As with Santa Maria, he deposited herd animals on the island, and sent to Portugal tree branches, pigeons, a box of dirt and other signs of the new land. Settlement of Santa Maria and São Miguel began in earnest, and Gonçalo Velho became the Donatary-Captain of both islands (Santa Maria was settled in 1439, and colonists started arriving on São Miguel in 1444). During this period, he ordered the burning/clearing of lands and donated vast tracts of lands to family members and loyal servants, who began to cultivate wheat, raised honey-bees and planted grapevines from Crete. At the same time the Infante Henry had ordered Moorish peoples (Portuguese: mouriscos de África) with Cabral to immediately settle the newly discovered lands of São Miguel, who found signs of attempted earlier settlement of the island. In 1445, Cabral returned to the waters of São Miguel with nobles and settlers (bringing with them herd animals, birds, wheat and vegetables) in order to settle the island. Arriving in a period of seismic activity, his crew discovered floating pumice stone and tree trunks as arrived closer to their port. Making landfall on 29 September they encountered the Moorish settlers who, over time "perished" (but likely became intermingled in the ensuing population).

== Later life ==
Under his administration, São Miguel and Santa Maria remained a single Captaincy until 1474, when Velho Cabral sold São Miguel to Rui Gonçalves da Câmara. His sister Teresa's only child João Soares, a physician by profession, succeeded Gonçalo Velho Cabral as second Donatary-Captain of Santa Maria and São Miguel; João Soares was married twice: to Brites Godins (d. 1474), with whom they had no heirs, and later Branca de Sousa Falcão (daughter of João de Sousa Falcão, Lord de Figueiredo and Lord of the Manor de Fataúnços) whose son inherited the Captaincy of Santa Maria.
