= Governorate General of Bahia =

Polity

Governorate General of Bahia Governo-Geral da Bahia
- 1572–1578; 1607–1613
- Flag Coat of arms

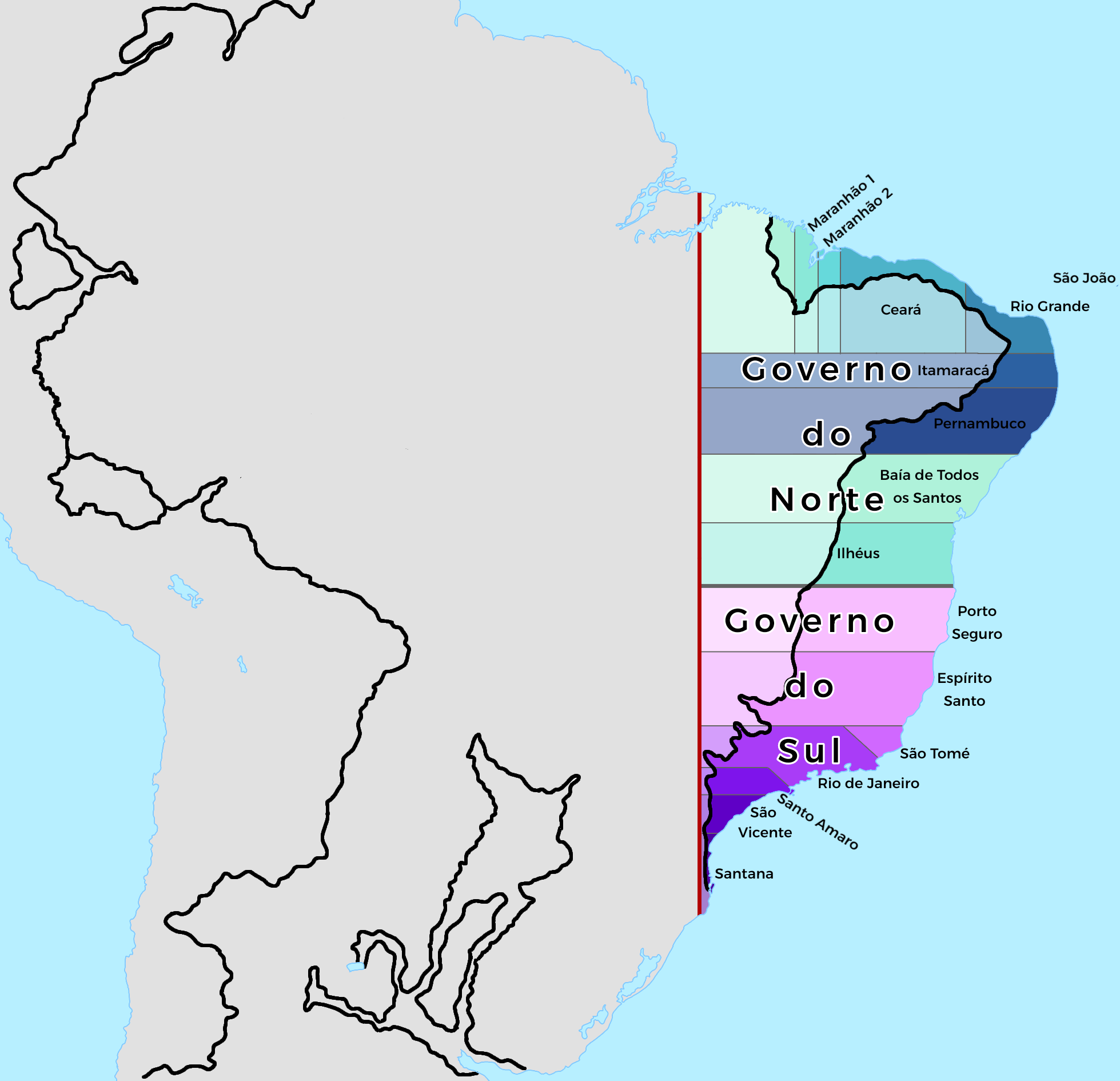
- Brazil in 1574
- Status: Colonial State of the Portuguese Empire
- Capital: São Salvador (Bahia)
- Common languages: Portuguese
- Religion: Roman Catholicism
- Government: Dependent territory under a feudal monarchy
- Monarch
  - 1572–1578: Sebastian I
  - 1607–1613: Philip II
- Governor General
  - 1572–1578: Luís de Brito e Almeida
  - 1607–1613: Lourenço da Veiga
- History
  - Established: 1572
  - Disestablished: 1613
- Currency: Portuguese Real
| Preceded by | Succeeded by |
| Governorate General of Brazil | Governorate General of Brazil |

The Governorate General of Bahia (Portuguese: Governo-Geral da Bahia) was a colonial administration of the Portuguese Empire.

== History ==
In 1534, John III of Portugal started granting land rights to colonize Portuguese territory in South America, they were the Captaincy Colonies of Brazil. These fifteen autonomous and separate colonies were, for the most part, a failure administratively, and thus economically.

In 1549, in order to solve the governance problem of his South American colonies, John III established the Governorate General of Brazil. The governorate united the fifteen colonies into a single colony, but each captaincy would continue to exist as a provincial administrative unit of the governorate.

In 1572, in order to establish a stronger and more capable military presence in the continent, the governorate was dismantled into two separate colonies, the Governorate General of Bahia, which encompassed the northern part, and the Governorate General of Rio de Janeiro, which took the south.

In 1578, the governorate was reestablished from the governorates of Bahia and Rio de Janeiro. This second Governorate General of Brazil would be once again partitioned into the two separate colonies, in 1607.

Finally in 1613, the Governorate General of Rio de Janeiro and the Governorate General of Bahia merged to form the third, and final, Governorate General of Brazil.

== See also ==
- Governorate General of Brazil
- Governorate General of Rio de Janeiro
- Captaincy Colonies of Brazil
- Colonial Brazil
- Portuguese Empire
