= Chief Armourer of the Kingdom of Portugal =

Those trusted with a monarch's armour

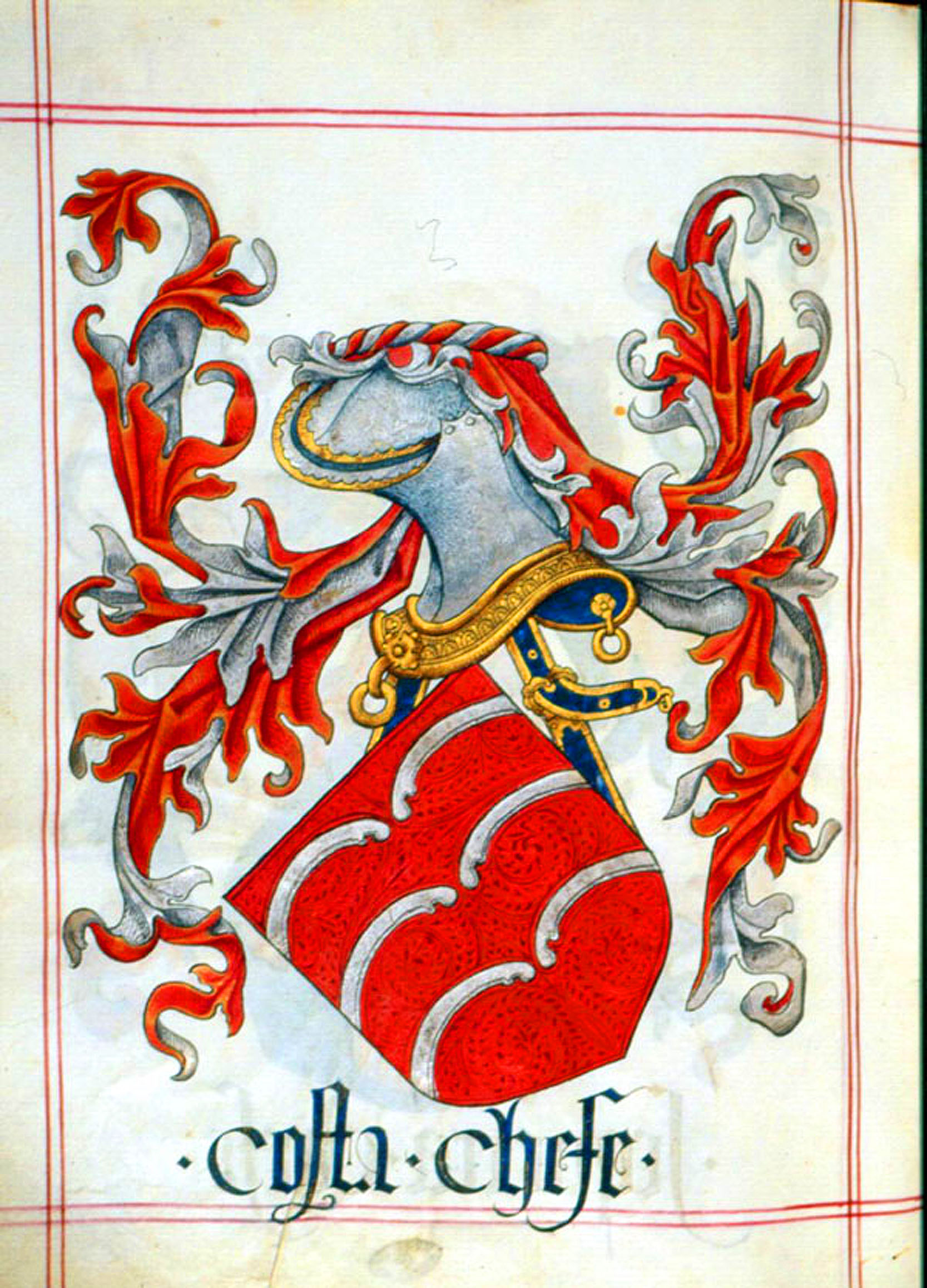
Arms of the Costa family in the Livro do Armeiro-Mor

Chief Armourer of the Kingdom (Portuguese: Armeiro-Mor do Reino, also given as Armador-Mor especially in older sources) was a courtly position in the Kingdom of Portugal, instituted by King Afonso V. Their duties consisted of assisting the monarch with dressing in his armour, taking care of the monarch's weapons, and supplying him whenever he was to take arms.

The Chief Armourer was also the depositary of the precious Livro do Armeiro-Mor, the oldest and most important roll of arms of the Kingdom, starting with Álvaro da Costa, who occupied the position under King Manuel I in c. 1508–1522. The office became hereditary under Álvaro da Costa, and would later pass to the Counts and Viscounts of Mesquitela.

== List of Chief Armourers of the Kingdom ==
Tentative list published in Luís Caetano de Lima's Geografia Histórica de Todos os Estados Soberanos da Europa (1734):

1. Vasco Anes Corte-Real
2. Antão de Faria
3. Gomes de Figueiredo
4. Agostinho Caldeira
5. Álvaro da Costa
6. Duarte da Costa
7. Álvaro da Costa
8. Francisco da Costa
9. Gonçalo da Costa
10. Pedro da Costa
11. António Estêvão da Costa
12. José da Costa e Sousa
13. José Francisco da Costa, 2nd Viscount of Mesquitela
14. Luís da Costa de Sousa Macedo e Albuquerque, 1st Count of Mesquitela
