= Province of Sergipe =

Province of Sergipe Província de Sergipe
- Flag Coat of arms

- Map of Sergipe within Brazil, 1889
- Status: Province
- Capital: São Cristóvão (1821-1855), Aracaju (1855-1889)
- Other languages: Portuguese
- Religion: Roman Catholicism
- Demonym: Sergipano
- Government: Parliamentary monarchy
  - 1821: Carlos César Burlamaqui (first)
  - 1889: Jerônimo Sodré Pereira (last)
- Legislature: Parliament
- History
  - Established: 1821
  - Disestablished: 1889

Population
  - 1872 census: 176,243
- Currency: Réis
| Preceded by | Succeeded by |
| Captaincy of Sergipe | Sergipe |

The Province of Sergipe (Central northeastern portuguese pronunciation: [pɾoˈvĩsjɐ di sɛ(ɦ)ˈʒipi]) was one of provinces of the United Kingdom of Portugal, Brazil and the Algarves, and later of the Empire of Brazil, it was created in the 28th of February 1821, succeeding the Captaincy of Sergipe. It was elevated to the status of State in 1889, during the First Brazilian Republic.
