= Da Costa Book of Hours =

15th century book of hours by Simon Bening

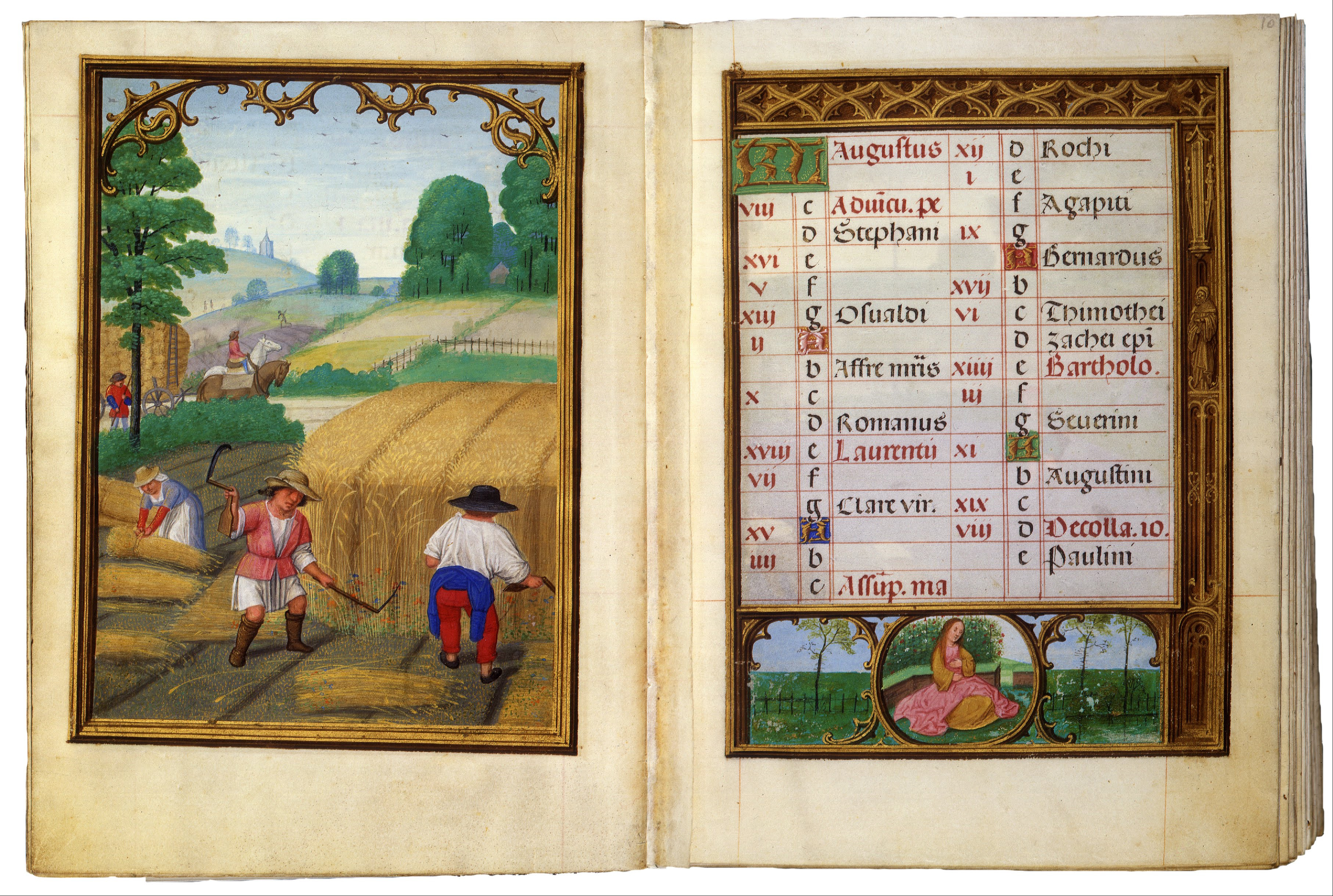
August from the book's calendar

The Da Costa Book of Hours is a 1515 book of hours, an illuminated manuscript now in the Morgan Library and Museum in New York. It was produced by Simon Bening and his workshop, possibly for a member of the Portuguese Sá family, before later belonging to Álvaro da Costa, an advisor to Manuel I of Portugal.
