= Governorate General of Brazil =

Administration of the Portuguese Empire

Governorate General of Brazil Governo-Geral do Brasil
- 1549–1572; 1578–1607; 1613–1621
- Flag of Portugal

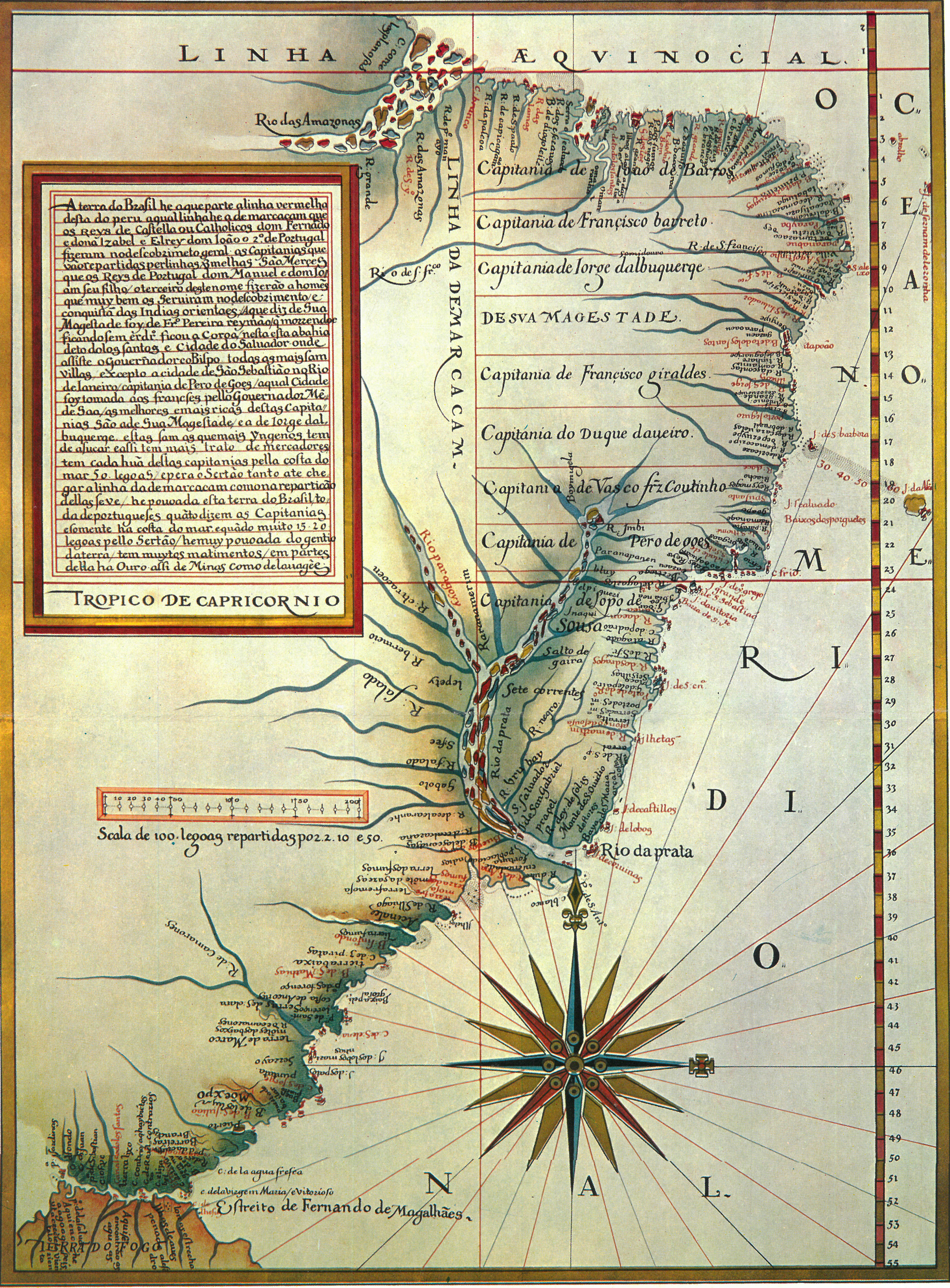
- Captaincies of the Governorate General of Brazil by 1574
- Status: Colonial State of the Portuguese Empire
- Capital: São Salvador
- Common languages: Portuguese
- Religion: Roman Catholicism
- Government: Dependent territory under a feudal monarchy
- Monarch
  - 1549–1557: John III
  - 1598–1621: Philip II
- Governor General
  - 1549–1553: Tomé de Sousa
- History
  - Established: 1549
  - Disestablished: 1621
- Currency: Portuguese Real
Preceded by
Captaincy Colonies of Brazil
Governorate General of Rio de Janeiro
Governorate General of Bahia
Succeeded by
Governorate General of Rio de Janeiro
Governorate General of Bahia
State of Brazil
State of Maranhão (colonial)

The Governorate General of Brazil (Governo-Geral do Brasil) was a colonial administration of the Portuguese Empire in present-day Brazil. A governorate was equivalent in status to a viceroyalty, though the title viceroy didn't come into use until the early 18th century. They were ruled by a Governor General who reported to the Crown. The Governor General had direct authority over the constituent royal captaincies, and nominal but ill-defined authority over the donatary captaincies. One captaincy, that of Duarte Coelho in Pernambuco, was exempt by royal decree from the authority of the Governors General.

== History ==
In 1549, in order to solve the governance problem of his South American colonies, King John III of Portugal established the Governorate General of Brazil. The governorate united the fifteen original donatary captaincy colonies some of which had reverted to the Crown, and others of which had been abandoned, into a single colony, but each captaincy would continue to exist as a provincial administrative unit of the governorate. For two brief periods from 1572–78 and 1607–13, the Governorate General of Brazil was partitioned into the Governorate General of Rio de Janeiro in the south, and the Governorate General of Bahia in the north.

In 1621, the Governorate General of Brazil was partitioned into two colonies, the State of Brazil and the State of Maranhão.

== Composition ==
From the original captaincies, additional donatary captaincies were carved out.

=== Captaincies created under the governorates ===
- Captaincy of Paraíba
- Captaincy of Rio Grande de Norte
- Captaincy of Cabo Frio
- Captaincy of Paraguacu
- Captaincy of Itaparica and Itamarandiba

The northern section of the captaincy of Sao Vicente was renamed to Captaincy of Rio de Janeiro.
