= João Soares de Sousa =

Portuguese politician

2nd Donatary-Captain of Santa Maria
- In office 1499–1571
- Monarchs: Manuel I; John III; Sebastian
- Preceded by: João Soares de Albergaria
- Succeeded by: Pedro Soares de Sousa
- Constituency: Santa Maria

Personal details
- Born: João Soares de Sousa; 1493 Vila do Porto
- Died: 1571 (aged 77–78) Vila do Porto
- Resting place: Church of Nossa Senhora da Assunção
- Citizenship: Kingdom of Portugal
- Other political affiliations: Guiomar da Cunha; Jordoa Faleiro; Maria de Andrade
- Children: Pedro Soares de Sousa; Manuel de Sousa; Rui de Sousa; André de Sousa; Gonçalo Velho; Álvaro de Sousa
- Parents: João Soares de Albergaria; Branca de Sousa Falcão

João Soares de Sousa (1493, in Vila do Porto – 2 January 1571, in Vila do Porto) was the third Donatary-Captain of Santa Maria, succeeding his father João Soares de Albergaria, who had died in 1499.

== Biography ==
=== Early life ===
João Soares de Sousa was born in Vila do Porto in 1493, the son of João Soares de Albergaria and Branca de Sousa Falcão. The third Donatary-Captain of Santa Maria, João Soares was the first born in Santa Maria. Since João Soares de Sousa was six years old when his father died, his father's lieutenant João de Marvão—a knight in the Royal House and sheriff of Vila do Porto—served as regent until 1522.

Soares de Sousa began serving as Donatary-Captain in 1522, holding the position until he died in 1571. His position was confirmed on 13 March 1527.

=== Donatary-Captain ===
João Soares de Sousa was maritime commander, a man of "elevated stature, swarthy, strong and animated, a noble man and charitable". He rented his lands on the island in a way that mitigated Santa Maria's endemic poverty by pardoning debts and extending deadlines, as well as by not requiring a fixed payment for the use of mills. Azorean donatary-captains were known for charging a fixed rate, but João Soares allowed people to pay what they could and never cited them for their debts. In years when crops failed and famine struck the island, he permitted people to kill sheep, but required them to return the pelts and wool.

At the beginning of Soares de Sousa's captaincy, João de Aveiro—a notary from São Miguel—was sent to Santa Maria by the Corregedor António de Macedo in order to challenge Soares de Sousa's mandate, due to a judgment against him. Sousa was sent to Lisbon as a prisoner, where he appealed his sentence and was ultimately freed. On 12 July 1517 he sold concessions to soap production on the island of São Miguel to Henrique de Bettencourt.

The captain and his family lived on the current Rua de Frei Gonçalo Velho in Vila do Porto, where the ruins of his home still exist. Curiously, the five existing doorways providing access to the compound are not original, but were designed by sculptor António Teixeira Lopes in 1924 during a visit by Azorean intellectuals.

=== Later life ===
João Soares de Sousa first married Guiomar da Cunha, the well-connected daughter of Francisco da Cunha, who was also a cousin of the Viceroy of India D. Afonso de Albuquerque and Brites da Câmara (Câmara being a niece of João Gonçalves Zarco, the first Donatary-Captain of Funchal). Following the death of his first wife he married Jordoa Faleiro, daughter of Fernão Vaz Faleiro, a notary of Vila do Porto, and D. Filipa de Resendes. Even later he married Maria de Andrade, daughter of Nuno Fernandes Velho, master of Larache.

João Soares de Sousa had 24 children with his three spouses. His son Pedro Soares de Sousa—who succeeded him as Donatary-Captain of Santa Maria—was born as a result of his first marriage. Other sons from his first marriage include: Manuel de Sousa, who in his youth killed a man but escaped to fight in France, Italy, and Tunis under Charles V, Holy Roman Emperor (but who ultimately died in Santa Maria, after a 35-year absence, in combat with French pirates who burned Vila do Porto); Rui de Sousa, who died in combat in India; and André de Sousa, who married Mécia de Lemos, daughter of D. Luís de Figueiredo Lemos, Bishop of Funchal. Soares de Sousa's children from his second marriage include: Gonçalo Velho, who died at sea; and Álvaro de Sousa, who married D. Isabel, daughter of Amador Vaz Faleiro. Álvaro de Sousa and D. Isabel's daughter D. Jordoa de Sousa Faleiro—João Soares de Sousa's granddaughter—eventually married Fernão de Andrade Velho before Barbary pirates took her captive to North Africa in 1616.

João Soares de Sousa died on 2 January 1571 in Vila do Porto. He was buried in the presbytery of the Church of Nossa Senhora da Assunção (Our Lady of the Assumption) in Vila do Porto, near the door to the sacristy.
