= Fernão Velho =

Portuguese nobleman

- Senhor de Veleda
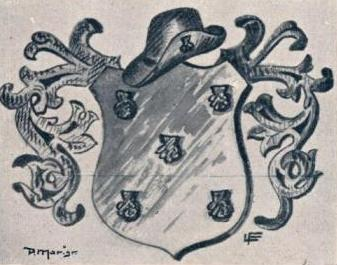
- brasao de armas of Velhos
- Born: 14th-century Portugal
- Died: 15th-century Portugal
- Noble family: Velhos

Fernão Velho (born 14th century) was a Portuguese nobleman who served in the Kingdom of Portugal as Alcaide of Veleda and squire of Peter, Duke of Coimbra.

== Biography ==
Fernão was born in Portugal, the son of Gonçalo Anes Velho, o Contador, and Margarida Annes Durró, belonging to a noble Portuguese family. His wife was Maria Álvares Cabral, daughter or granddaughter of Álvaro Gil Cabral, Lord of Belmonte, and Catarina Anes de Loureiro, a noble lady, belonging to the Casa do Loureiro.

Fernão Velho and Maria Álvares Cabral were the parents of Gonçalo Velho Cabral, who discovered the Santa Maria and São Miguel Islands.
