= Rui Gonçalves da Câmara =

- Rui da Câmara

1st Captain-Donatário of São Miguel
- In office 10 March 1474 – 27 November 1497
- Monarchs: Alphonso V; John II; Emmanuel I
- Preceded by: João Soares de Albergaria
- Succeeded by: João Rodrigues da Câmara
- Constituency: São Miguel

Personal details
- Born: Rui Gonçalves da Câmara; 1430
- Died: 27 November 1497 (aged 66–67) Vila Franca do Campo
- Resting place: Church of São Miguel
- Citizenship: Kingdom of Portugal
- Spouse: Maria de Bettencourt
- Children: João Rodrigues da Câmara

Rui Gonçalves da Câmara (c. 1430 – 27 November 1497), was the second son of João Gonçalves Zarco, and inherited the title of Donatary-Captain of the island of São Miguel in the Portuguese archipelago of the Azores. Rui Gonçalves da Câmara was made the third person to administer/manage the colonization of the island of São Miguel by regal charter on 10 March 1474 (becoming the first of the family Gonçalves da Câmara to obtain this title). After his 21-year mandate to administer the island of São Miguel, in which he was successful in promoting and establishing settlements throughout the colony, the Vila Franca do Campo received a foral (charter) as town.

== Biography ==
=== Early life ===
Rui Gonçalves da Câmara was the son of João Gonçalves Zarco, one of the men identified in the discovery of the archipelago of Madeira. Rui da Câmara married Maria de Bettencourt.

Rui Gonçalves became a squire in the House of D. Ferdinand, Duke of Viseu, and was favoured and confided by the Prince.

=== Captaincy ===
Until 1474, the island of São Miguel was part of a larger fiefdom bequeathed to João Soares de Albergaria, the Captaincy of Santa Maria and São Miguel. At that time, the island was a large, underpopulated and, therefore, unproductive possession of the Donatário Diogo, Duke of Viseu, nephew of King Edward: the Duke approved its transfer to Rui da Câmara, as his Captain on the island of São Miguel, during a period when João Soares de Albergaria was more preoccupied with the health of his wife, and looked to the sale as a way of improving his finances. Albergaria had decided to sell his concession while staying with their family on Madeira.

With broad physique and great intelligence, he occupied most of his administration with the establishment and settlement of his Capitania. Rui da Câmara was an imposing figure on his horse, wearing fur bonnet and large overcoat; he was unafraid to visit his fiefdom along without scribes, servants or soldiers. Apart from his small workforce that tended to his possessions, Rui da Câmara offered lands to settlers who were obligated to transform the uncultivated lands within a five-year contract. Those were unable to fulfill the contract would forfeit their lands to another, who were under the same obligations. It was through these conditions that the island was rapidly populated.
