= Luiz Velho =

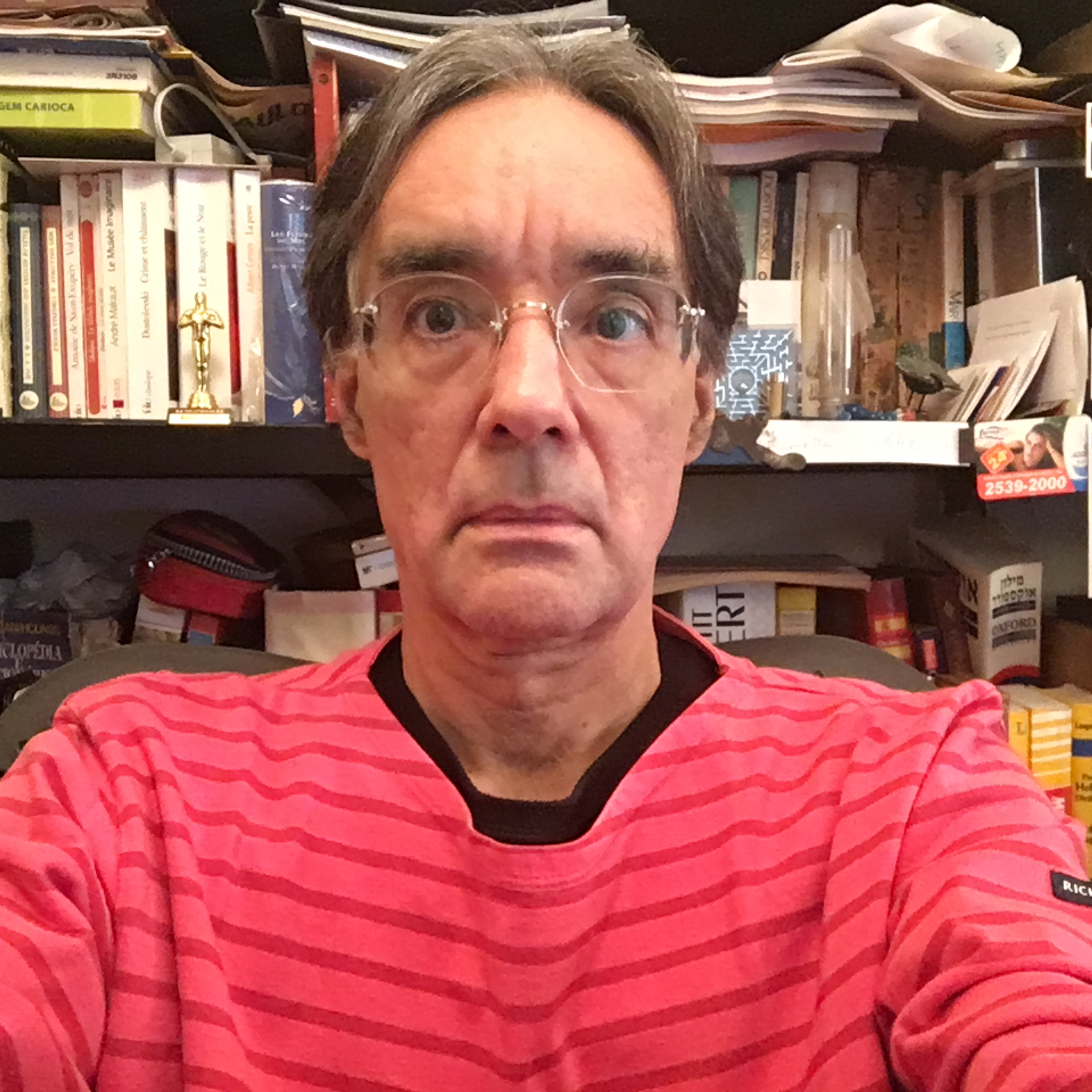
- Born: 5 June 1956 (age 68); Rio de Janeiro, Brazil
- Known for: 4-8 Subdivision Scheme
- Awards: National Order of Scientific Merit (2010)
- Scientific career
- Fields: Applied Mathematics
- Institutions: IMPA
- Thesis: Piecewise Description of Implicit Surfaces and Solids (1994)
- Doctoral advisor: Demetri Terzopoulos

Luiz Carlos Pacheco Rodrigues Velho (born 5 June 1956) is a Brazilian applied mathematician working primarily on computer graphics and computer vision. He is a full researcher and professor at Instituto Nacional de Matemática Pura e Aplicada (IMPA) and leading scientist of VISGRAF, laboratory that conducts researches in the field of modeling, rendering, imaging, and animation.

In 2010, Luiz Velho received the National Order of Scientific Merit for his scientific and technical contributions. In 2005, he was keynote speaker in Eurographics Symposium on Geometry Processing, in Vienna.

His academic background includes a BE in industrial design from ESDI-UERJ, a specialization in computer science from PUC-Rio, a MS in computer graphics from the MIT Media Lab, a Ph.D. in computer science from the University of Toronto and a postdoctoral fellowship in applied mathematics from IMPA.

== Selected publications ==
- Luiz Velho and Jonas Gomes. "Digital Halftoning with Space Filling Curves". Computer Graphics, 25(4):81–90, 1991.
- Luiz Velho and Denis Zorin. "4-8 Subdivision". Computer-Aided Geometric Design, 18(5):397–427, 2001. Special Issue on Subdivision Techniques.
- Jingdan Zhang, Kun Zhou, Luiz Velho, Baining Guo, and Heung-Yeung. "Synthesis of Progressively Variant Textures on Arbitrary Surfaces". ACM Transactions on Graphics, 22(3):295–302, July 2003.
