= Álvaro da Costa =

Portuguese nobleman (c. 1470–1540)

His Lordship D. Álvaro da Costa CvC
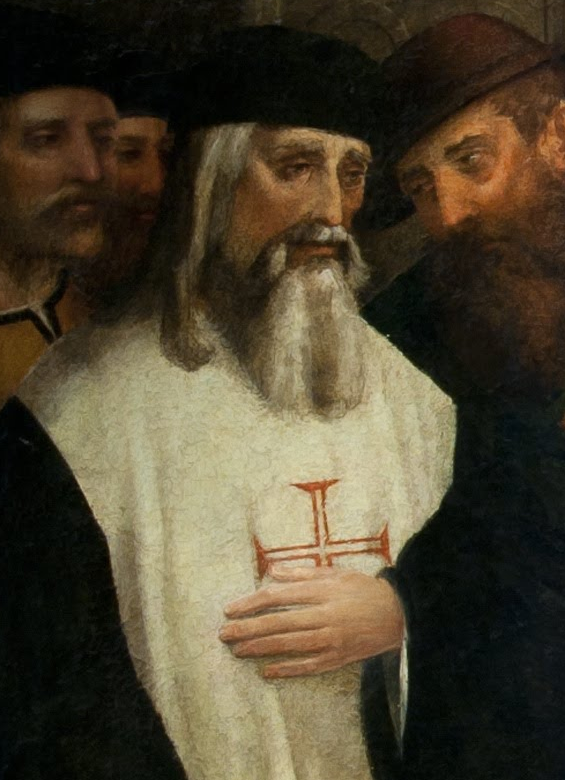
- Detail of a figure in Garcia Fernandes's 1541 Wedding of Saint Alexis, identified on the hem of his robes as "D. ALVARO DA COSTA PRIM.^{RO} P.^{DOR} DESTA CASA".

Chief Armourer of Portugal
- In office c. 1508 – 27 January 1522
- Monarch: Manuel I
- Preceded by: Agostinho Caldeira
- Succeeded by: Duarte da Costa

Personal details
- Born: c. 1470 São Vicente da Beira, Castelo Branco, Portugal
- Died: August 1540 Évora, Portugal
- Spouse: Beatriz de Paiva (died 1539)

D. Álvaro da Costa (c. 1470–1540) was a Portuguese fidalgo, diplomat and close advisor to King Manuel I.

He is particularly well-remembered today for having filled the important court position of Chief Armourer of Portugal: the 1509 Livro do Armeiro-Mor (Book of the Chief Armourer), the most important Portuguese roll of arms in existence, is thus known for having been kept by Álvaro da Costa and his descendants. Also associated with him is the Da Costa Book of Hours, 1515, now in the Morgan Library and Museum in New York.

== Biography ==
The earliest known documental evidence of Álvaro da Costa's existence has him as a chamberlain to Manuel, Duke of Beja, in 1494. When the Duke inherited the throne in 1495, Álvaro da Costa remained in the King's retinue; in 1498 he is identified as a knight of the King's household, and accompanied the King and his pregnant wife Queen Isabella when they were sworn heirs presumptive of the Crown of Castile.

At an unknown date, probably around the turn of the 16th century, Álvaro da Costa married Beatriz de Paiva. The marriage produced six children: Gil Eanes (1502), Duarte (1504), Manuel, Isabel, Ana, and Maria (1518). Initially, Beatriz de Paiva acted as wet nurse to John, Prince of Portugal, whose birth coincided with that of their eldest son Gil Eanes, however, she stopped lactating after having fallen ill.

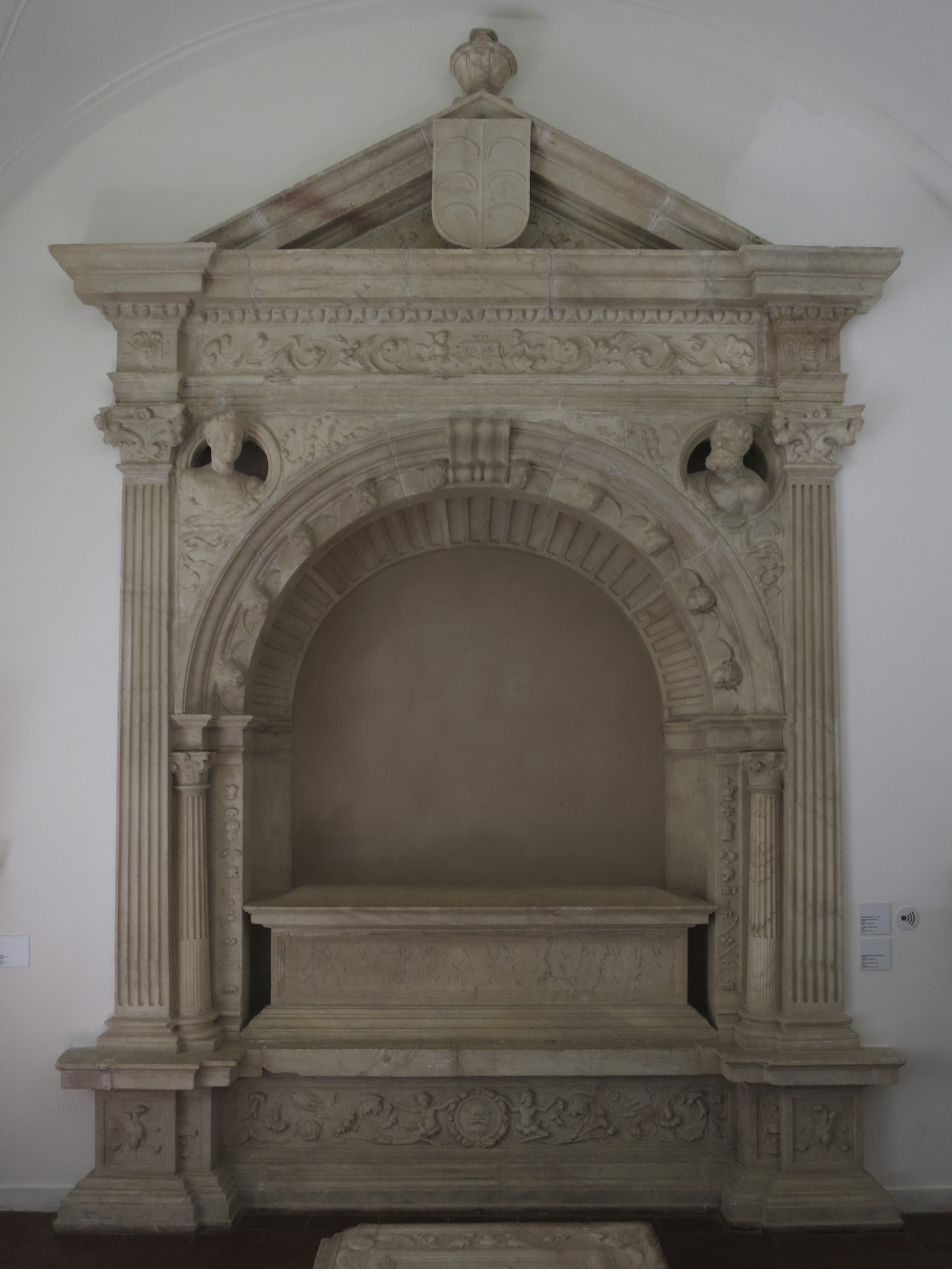
The tomb of Álvaro da Costa, Évora Museum

Álvaro da Costa also carried out important diplomatic activities on the King's behalf. It was Álvaro da Costa who, in 1506, brought King Manuel the first Golden Rose offered to him by Pope Julius II. In 1517, he was responsible for the secret negotiations for the King's third marriage, to Eleanor of Austria, in political circumstances of particular complexity; it was Álvaro da Costa who stood in for the King during the proxy wedding ceremony held in Zaragoza in 1518. He was entrusted with a final diplomatic mission in 1520: the negotiations for the marriage of the King's daughter, Infanta Beatrice, to Charles III, Duke of Savoy.

In 1539, Álvaro da Costa was elected Chairman (Provedor) of the Lisbon Holy House of Mercy.

Álvaro da Costa died probably around August 1540. He was buried in the Convent of Our Lady of Paradise, in Évora, in an elaborate Mannerist arcosolium sculpted still in Costa's lifetime by Nicolas Chantereine. When the convent was abandoned and later demolished in the 19th century, the funerary monument was moved to what would become Évora Museum, where it still stands today.
