= Captaincies of the Spanish Empire =

Divisions of colonial Spanish America and the Spanish Philippines

Captaincies (Spanish: capitanías) were military and administrative divisions in colonial Spanish America and the Spanish East Indies, established in areas under risk of foreign invasion or Indian attack. They could consist of just one province, or group several together. These captaincies general should be distinguished from the ones given to almost all of the conquistadores, which was based on an older tradition. During the Reconquista, the term "captain general" and similar ones had been used for the official in charge of all the troops in a given district. This office was transferred to America during the conquest and was usually granted along with the hereditary governorship to the adelantado in the patent issued by the Crown. This established a precedent that was recognized by the New Laws of 1542, but ultimately the crown eliminated all hereditary governorships in its overseas possessions.

With the establishment of appointed governors, who served only for a few years, captaincies were created in the areas where the crown deemed them necessary. The new captaincies general were governed by what was also called a captain general, and it is this title alone that is usually used by historians. The title of captain general itself is a high military rank of general officer grade, equivalent to the rank of Field Marshal, as well as a gubernatorial title. However, in practice this was a person who held two distinct offices: one military, which granted him command of the regional forces (the "captaincy general" proper), and another civilian, which included the presidency of the audiencia, if there was one in the provincial capital, (the governorship). The specific powers of any governor-captain general varied by time and place and were specified in the decrees establishing the captaincy general. The institution of the captaincy general predated the viceroyalty, but was incorporated into the latter when the viceroyalties were established in the mid-16th century.

Some captaincies general, such as Guatemala, Chile and Venezuela were eventually split off from their viceroyalties for better-administration purposes. Although under the nominal jurisdiction of their viceroys, governors-captains general were virtually independent, because the law granted them special military functions and, given the considerable distance of their districts from the viceregal capital, they were authorized to deal directly with the King and the Council of the Indies, in Madrid. The institution was later revived as part of the Bourbon Reforms. Captaincies general were introduced into Spain beginning in 1713 during the War of the Spanish Succession. After the losses of the Seven Years' War, the Bourbon kings established new ones in many American regions, that had not had them before. Along with the new governors-captains general, the Bourbons introduced the position of Intendant, to handle civilian and military expenses.

== Spanish Captaincies ==
- New Spain (1524), elevated to Viceroyalty of New Spain in 1535.
- Peru (1528), elevated to Viceroyalty of Peru in 1542.
- Santo Domingo (1540)
- Chile (1541), originally part of the Viceroyalty of Peru, it was split off in 1789 as a captaincy general.
- Guatemala (1560), raised to captaincy general in 1609.
- Yucatán (1564), which included Campeche and Quintana Roo, besides Yucatán state proper. An Intendancy was added in 1786.
- New Granada (1563), elevated to Viceroyalty of New Granada in 1717.
- Puerto Rico (1580).
- Cuba (1764), a captaincy general which included the Louisiana Territory acquired from France in 1763 and Florida after 1784. Cuba was split from New Spain upon the latter's independence, as was Mexico.
- Venezuela (1777), a captaincy general split from the Viceroyalty of New Granada.
- Commandancy General of the Provincias Internas (1776), analogous to a fully autonomous captaincy general, but financially dependent on New Spain.

== See also ==
- Captaincy
- Captaincy General of Catalonia
- Captaincies of the Portuguese Empire
- Captaincy General of the Philippines
