= Tomé de Sousa =

Governor-general of Brazil (1503–1579)

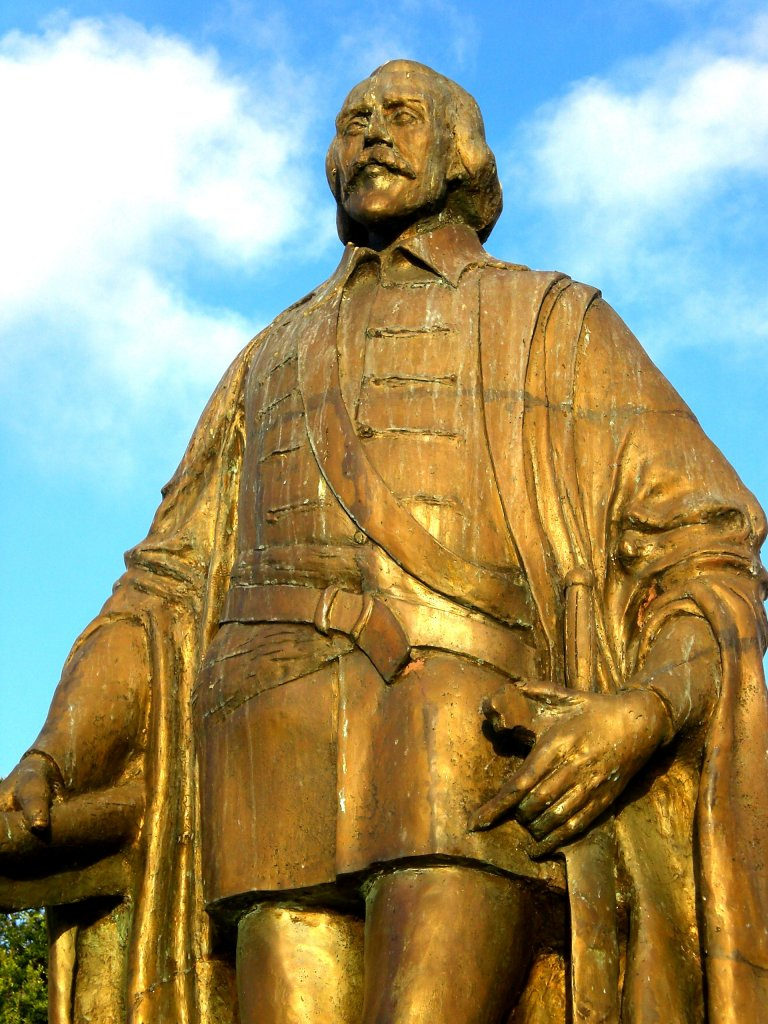
- Statue of Tomé de Sousa at Tomé de Sousa Square, Salvador, Brazil

1st Governor-General of Brazil
- In office 1549–1553
- Monarch: John III
- Preceded by: Office established
- Succeeded by: Duarte da Costa

Personal details
- Born: 1503 Rates, Kingdom of Portugal
- Died: 1579 (aged 75–76) Kingdom of Portugal
- Spouse: Maria da Costa
- Children: Helena de Sousa; Francisco de Sousa; Garcia de Sousa; Iria de Sousa; Ana de Sousa
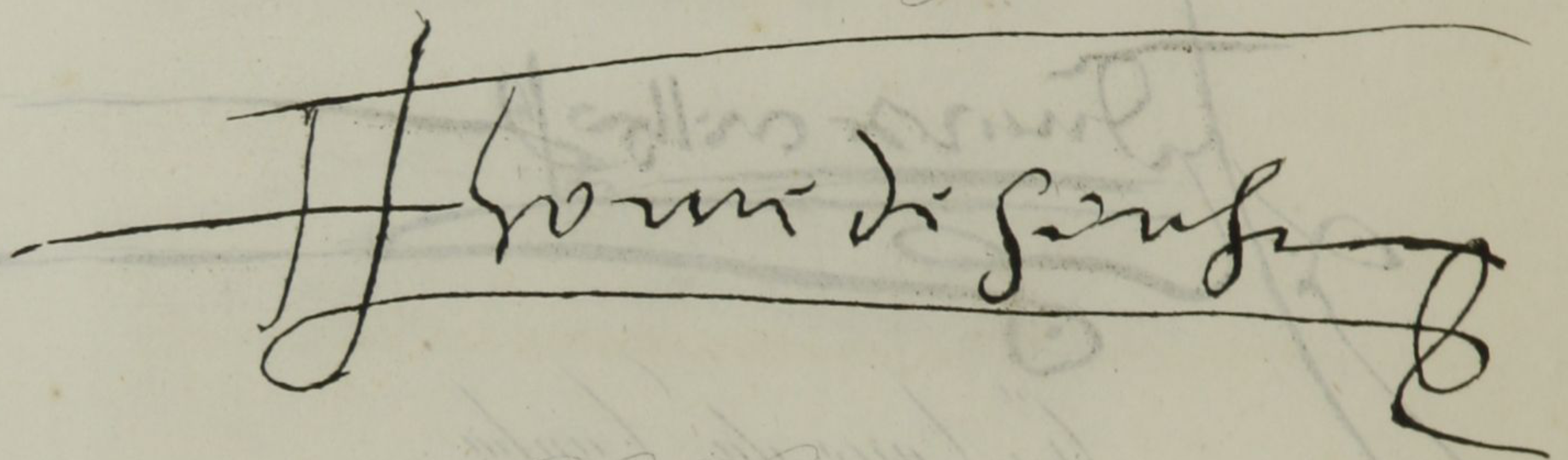
- Signature

Military service
- Allegiance: Portuguese Empire

Tomé de Sousa (1503–1579) was a Portuguese nobleman and soldier who served as the first governor-general of the Portuguese colony of Brazil from 1549 to 1553. Born in Rates, Póvoa de Varzim, Sousa took part in military expeditions in Africa, fought the Moors and commanded the nau Conceição to Portuguese India, part of the armada of Fernão de Andrade. Sousa was also the first knight commander of the medieval Monastery of Rates, re-established in 1100 and dissolved in the 16th century.

== Before Brazil ==
Born into nobility, Sousa was fathered by a Prior and a descendant of King Afonso III, Dom João de Sousa. Despite being born illegitimately, he worked for the royal court from a young age with the support of Antônio de Ataíde, his cousin and the count of Castenheira. Before becoming governor-general of Brazil, Sousa fought as a soldier in Morocco and North Africa, and traveled for the Indian spice trade. In 1536, Sousa was recognized by the Portuguese government for his service, and he was knighted three years later for military achievement.

== Sousa in Brazil ==
Sousa sailed for Brazil with six ships, soldiers, and one thousand settlers and missionaries. His objectives were to fend off French pirates and convert local Indigenous peoples with the goal of strengthening Portugal's royal power in Brazil. Up until that point, Brazil had been largely neglected by the Crown, which was concentrating its efforts into the more lucrative spice trade in India. Its decline and increasing threats around Brazil's borders by the surrounding Spanish colonies prompted Portugal to intervene. As part of this mission, Sousa approached the Donatário of Bahia, Francisco Pereira Coutinho, to buy what would become the capital city of Salvador on the Atlantic coast between São Paulo and Pernambuco.

The new capital was in a better defended location and fortified by Sousa himself. It was supposed to bring together the twelve pre-existing settlements, though Sousa traversed the bordering areas in an effort to promote his idea of justice and to diminish what the Portuguese saw as the lawlessness and chaos of the region. He led other Portuguese forces by sending officials to other Brazilian captaincies to ensure proper procedure and to regulate administration. He planned on making the colony a strong military base to protect the Portuguese settlers from Indigenous or outside forces. He accomplished this by expelling hostile natives for safe colonization. Sousa brought 1,000 settlers and soldiers with him on an expedition to Brazil, including four hundred degredados, "men banished from Portugal for some minor criminal activity."

Among the colonists were six Jesuits, the first in Brazil, whom he assisted in the Christianization of the natives and helped to reaffirm the King's rule over the colonies. Sousa's relationship with Manuel da Nóbrega and the Jesuit missionaries allowed him to keep watch on other territories and Indigenous tribes. Along with those he brought, Sousa made land grants to other settlers. He was successful in decreasing the hostilities waged against the colonists by natives, in part through diplomatic means, but primarily through his use of cruel and often extreme punishment. Along with Christianization, Sousa established days of market to encourage trade between settlers and the natives.

Throughout his time in office, Sousa fortified Portuguese territories and established new communities with churches and schools. He introduced livestock and established sugarcane production. He is also credited for establishing the first bishopric of Brazil with Dom Pero Fernandes Sardinha. In 1553, Sousa worked far outside of his own territory of Salvador. Sousa strengthened the economy and defenses of São Vicente. He also went on to establish the village of Itanhaém. That year, Sousa ventured home, leaving Salvador in the hands of Duarte da Costa.

== Return to Portugal ==
In 1552, Sousa suggested that Rio de Janeiro might be a potential area for settlement and in 1553 he returned to Portugal to work with the King, acting as his adviser on Brazilian affairs. Sousa also helped to attract settlers to Brazil by installing municipal organizations, similar to the ones in Portugal, into the cities. He also managed to appoint local officials over the captaincies and strengthened tactical areas around the coast that would be beneficial to the safety of the citizens.

== Descendants ==
According to the traditions of the de Souza family of West Africa, their founding patriarch - Francisco Félix de Sousa, the Chacha of Ouidah - was a direct descendant of Tomé de Sousa. He arrived in Dahomey after leaving Brazil, and went on to become an African chieftain after serving as a powerful slave trader and royal advisor. With his harem of black consorts, he had a brace of children whose lineal descendants would go on to be prominent in the region. President Paul-Emile de Souza of Benin and his niece Chantal de Souza Boni Yayi, the first lady to President Boni Yayi of Benin, are arguably the most notable of them.
