= João Soares de Albergaria =

Portuguese politician

- João Soares

1st Donatary-Captain of Santa Maria
- In office 1474–1499
- Monarchs: Alphonso V; John II; Emmanuel I
- Preceded by: Gonçalo Velho Cabral
- Succeeded by: João Soares de Sousa
- Constituency: Santa Maria

Personal details
- Born: João Soares; 1415
- Died: 1499 (aged 83–84)
- Citizenship: Kingdom of Portugal
- Other political affiliations: Brites Godins; Branca de Sousa Falcão
- Relations: Parents: Fernão Soares de Albergaria; Teresa Velho Cabral
- Children: João Soares de Sousa; Pedro Soares; D. Maria; D. Violante
- Nickname: João Soares Velho

João Soares de Albergaria (c. 1415 – 1499), also referred to as João Soares (or João Soares Velho), was the second Portuguese Dontary-Captain of the islands of Santa Maria and São Miguel, succeeding his maternal uncle Gonçalo Velho Cabral in the title. After selling his rights to the Captaincy of São Miguel to Rui Gonçalves da Câmara, he continued as Donatary-Captain of Santa Maria.

== Biography ==
=== Early life ===
João Soares de Albergaria was the son of Fernão Soares de Albergaria and Teresa Velho Cabral, the latter a sister of Gonçalo Velho Cabral.

He married Brites Godins, who quickly became sick. Their marriage would not produce heirs. In 1474, due to his wife's illness, Albergaria moved to the island of Madeira in order to "find remedies and medics", as well as a milder climate for her to convalesce in. They lodged with the family of the Captain of Funchal João Gonçalves Zarco and that of his brother, Rui Gonçalves da Câmara. As Azorean chronicler Gaspar Frutuoso would later relate, due to São Miguel's perceived unproductivity and the many costs Soares de Albergaria incurred during his move to Funchal and treatments for his wife, Albergaria decided to sell the Captaincy of São Miguel to Rui Gonçalves for his hospitality in return for 2,000 cruzados and 60,000 kilograms (130,000 lb) of sugar. Beatriz, Duchess of Viseu and Diogo, Duke of Viseu approved this contract, and King Afonso V of Portugal ratified it on 10 March 1474.

=== Captaincy ===
During his captaincy, Albergaria promoted settlement of Santa Maria—attracting settlers from both Portugal (mainly Algarve) and continental Europe—and founded the principal village of Vila do Porto. It became the base for future Captains-Generals in the Azores. Before this, his maternal uncle Gonçalo Velho Cabral had been "Commander of Santa Maria and Captain of the Azores" within a structural framework that was not properly defined. In contrast, King Afonso V explicitly approved João Soares de Albergaria's captaincy in a 1474 edict:

We are to know that João Soares, knight of the House of the Duke of Viseu, my greatly loved cousin, and my esteemed nephew, that We were shown a title signed by Infanta Beatriz, my much-loved and esteemed sister, that made me know that the above son...was given the charge to João Soares the island of Santa Maria, that he be Captain of it.

As captain-general Albergaria was also responsible for the island's defense. However, in 1480 a Castilian corsair attacked Vila do Porto during the War of the Castilian Succession, sacking the town. Albergaria was captured and taken prisoner to Castile, where he was ransomed. He paid his own ransom eight days before peace were declared by Afonso V and Ferdinand of Castile at the end of 1480.

=== Later life ===
Albergaria later married Branca de Sousa Falcão, daughter of João de Sousa Falcão, 1st Lord de Figueiredo and 1st Lord of the Manor de Fataúnços, and D. Maria de Almada. They married on 20 June 1492 on the orders of King João II. They had at least four children together:

- João Soares de Sousa, who would inherit his father's title as 3rd Donatary-Captain of Santa Maria;
- Pedro Soares, who died overseas in Portuguese India;
- D. Maria, who married in Portugal; and
- D. Violante, who married a Castilian in Santa Maria.

Albergaria returned to Santa Maria from Madeira late in life. He died there in 1499 at 80 years of age. The captaincy of Santa Maria passed on to his descendants until its extinction in 1667, following the death Brás Soares de Sousa in 1664.
