= Captaincy =

Historical administrative division of the Spanish and Portuguese colonial empires

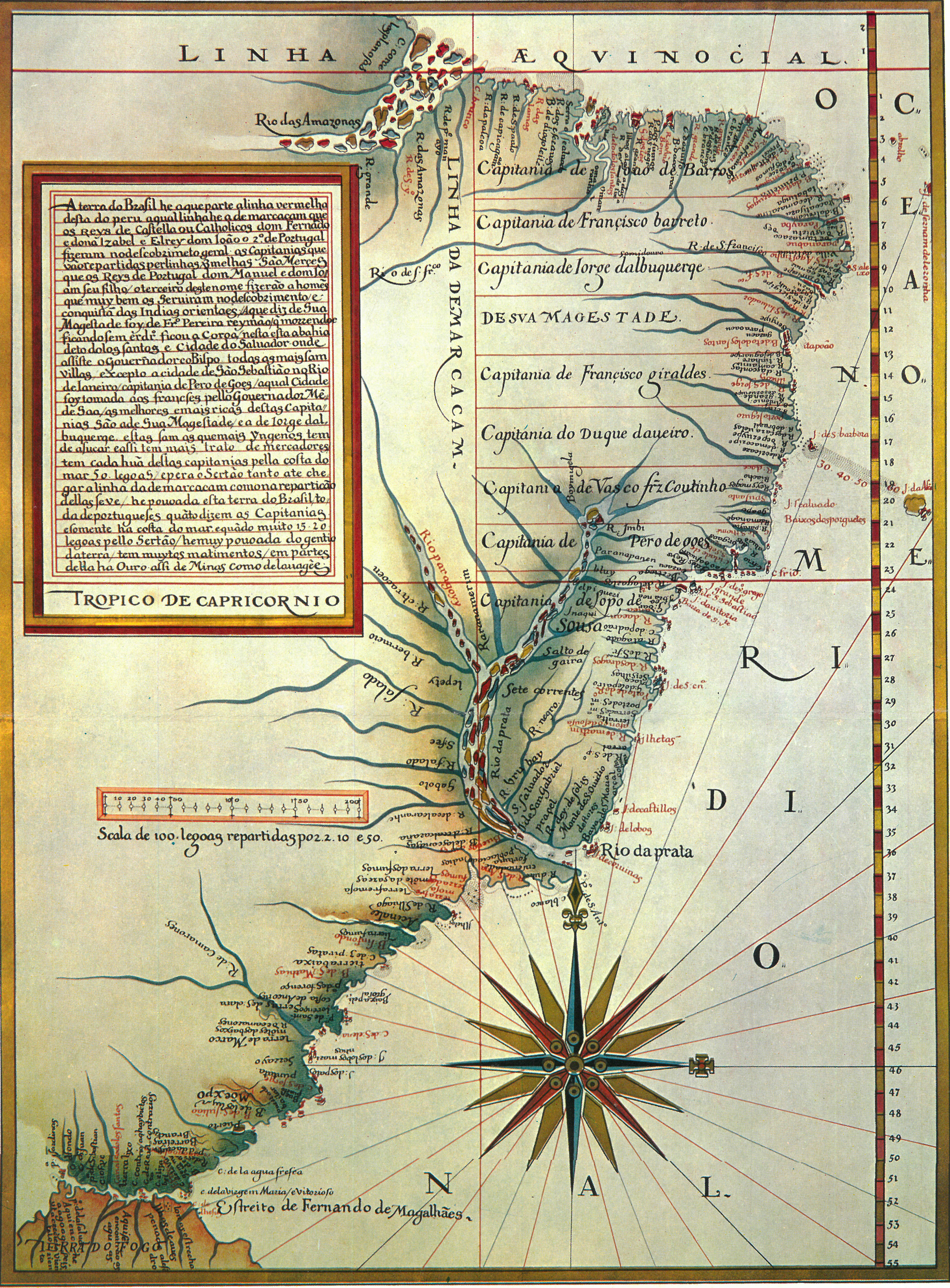

A captaincy (Spanish: capitanía [kapitaˈni.a], Portuguese: capitania [kɐpitɐˈni.ɐ], Croatian: kapetanija) is a historical administrative division of the former Spanish and Portuguese colonial empires. It was instituted as a method of organization, directly associated with the home-rule administrations of medieval feudal governments in which the monarch delimited territories for colonization that were administered by men of confidence.

The same term was or is used in some other countries, such as Croatia, Hungary, Italy, Ottoman Empire, Slovakia or Austria.

== Captaincy system ==
=== Portuguese Empire ===
The Captaincies of the Portuguese Empire were developed successively, based on the original donatário system established by King John I of Portugal in Madeira, and expanded with each successive new colony discovered. Prince Henry the Navigator instituted the Captaincy system to promote development of Portuguese discoveries, but it was in the Azores, where this system effectively functioned. The prince and his successors (the Donatários) remained on the mainland, unable to leave the court, owing to numerous responsibilities related to the Royal Household during the period of trans-Atlantic exploration. When the King constituted and bestowed the Donatary system, he never specifically thought of sending his donatários to the archipelagos. Consequently, the expansion of Portuguese overseas maritime authority resulted in the expansion of this system to their other dominions, including Madeira, Goa, Daman, Bombay and Bassein, the Azores and eventually Brazil.

=== Croatia ===
Croatia has so-called port captaincies that are responsible for the civilian administration of maritime matters.

=== Austria ===
In Austria, district captaincies (Bezirkshauptmannschaften) have existed since 1849. These are responsible for the general administration on a district level and are comparable to county offices in the United States.

== See also ==
- Captaincies of Brazil
- Captain-major
- Captain of the port
