= Alfredo Ellis Júnior =

Brazilian historian

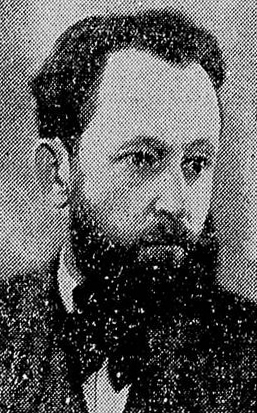
c. 1930

Alfredo Ellis Júnior (June 6, 1896 – June 13, 1974) was a Brazilian historian, sociologist, politician, and professor. He is best known for his studies on the bandeirante phenomenon, as well as for developing the concept of Paulistânia. He was a member of the Brazilian Historic and Geographic Institute.

== Biography ==
=== Early years ===
Born in São Carlos to a traditional family of early colonial settlers, Ellis Júnior was the son of Alfredo Ellis, a medical doctor and Republican politician who studied at the University of Pensylvannia. He grew up on a coffee plantation, where he received his early education. He was enrolled at the Colégio de São Bento, a boarding school run by Benedictine friars, where he attended classes in geography and universal history taught by Afonso d'Escragnolle Taunay, who later became a friend. Taunay guided his intellectual development by stimulating him to study the state of São Paulo and introducing him to historiography.

After completing his secondary education, he traveled through Portugal, France, Germany, and England. During this travels, his father encouraged him to pursue intellectual activity. Following his return to Brazil, he enrolled at the Faculty of Law of São Paulo, where he read extensively across a variety of subjects, with a particular interest in philosophy, psychology, and the works of Charles Darwin, Thomas Henry Huxley, and Ernst Haeckel. He was invited to join the secret society Burschenschaft paulista by Waldomiro de Carvalho and graduated in 1917.

=== Career ===
==== Literature and journalism ====
Ellis Júnior spent his early adulthood working as a lawyer, teaching at the Colégio de São Bento and contributing articles to the newspaper Correio Paulistano, through which he became connected to circles associated with the Paulista Republican Party, and made the acquaintance of future president Washington Luís. He was also part of the literary milieu of the verde-amarelismo movement, which brought together figures such as Cassiano Ricardo, Plínio Salgado, Menotti del Picchia, and Cândido Mota Filho, and frontally opposed the strand of modernism advocated by Oswald de Andrade, as expressed in the Manifesto Pau-Brasil.

It was by virtue of this environment that Ellis Filho began his intellectual career with the book Raça de gigantes, a study of the so-called ''paulista democracy'', developed as a historic analysis of the bandeiras and a racial interpretation of the people of São Paulo. His early works already revealed the influence of eugenics, as well as that of Brazilian thinkers such as Euclides da Cunha, on his thought. In 1928, he published O tesouro de Cavendish, a historical novel set in colonial Brazil.

==== Politics ====
In late 1925, Ellis Júnior was elected as a federal deputy for the state of São Paulo. He proposed the creation of a public body whose task would be regulating immigration influxes to São Paulo, suggesting eugenicist physician Edgar Roquette-Pinto as its head.

The Revolution of 1930, led by Getúlio Vargas, ended Ellis Júnior's first term as a deputy. He was among the activists involved with the Liga de Defesa Paulista, a political organization that advocated greater autonomy for the state of São Paulo. Along with other intellectuals, he co-founded the newspaper O Separatista, which called for the secession of the state. At the onset of the Constitutionalist Revolution, he enlisted as a soldier and fought in the Cunha front, where he was shot in the leg. Following the defeat of São Paulo, Ellis Júnior, reportedly disguised as an English tourist, took refuge on a friend's farm in order to avoid persecution and reprisals.

==== Academia ====
In 1938, Ellis Júnior presented the Faculty of Philosophy, Sciences and Letters of the newly-established University of São Paulo with a thesis titled Meio século de bandeirismo, which earned him the chair in History of Brazilian Civilization, previously occupied by his master, Taunay. The following year, he became director of the Faculty, a position he held until 1941.

== Works ==
- Raça de gigantes (1926)
- O tesouro de Cavendish: romance histórico brasileiro (1928)
- Populações paulistas (1934)
- Feijó e a primeira metade do século XX (1940)
- Capítulos da história social de São Paulo (1944)
- Meio século de bandeirismo (1946)
- O café e a Paulistânia (1950)
