= Caipiras =

Ethnic group native to Brazil

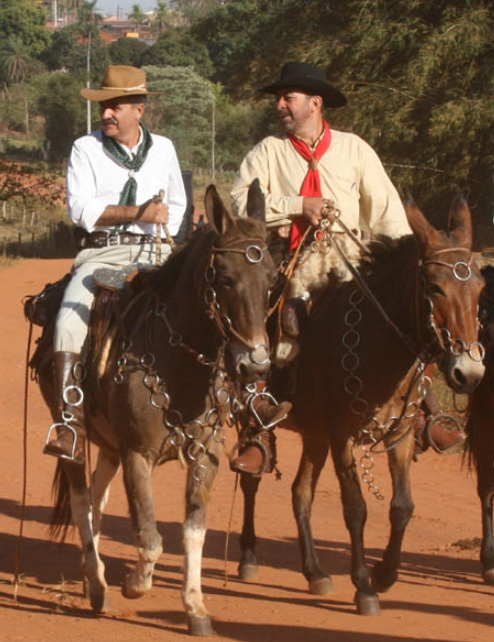
- Caipira vaqueiros in traditional costumes in São Paulo.

Total population
- c. 42-48 million (2022)

Languages
- Predominantly spoken: Caipira dialect; Portuguese; Historical: Paulista; Italo-Paulista

Religion
- Predominantly Roman Catholic

Related ethnic groups
- Paulistas, Paulistanos, Italians, Jews, Spaniards, Portugueses, Galicians, Brazilian indigenous and others

The Caipira people (Brazilian Portuguese: [kajˈpiɾɐ], Caipira dialect: [kajˈpiɹ(ɐ)]) are an ethnocultural group originally from the state of São Paulo. They are also distributed mainly among the Brazilian states of Goiás, Minas Gerais, Mato Grosso, Mato Grosso do Sul and Paraná, and historically associated with the colonization of the mountainous regions of Rio Grande do Sul and Santa Catarina. During the colonial period, their main mechanism of communication was the Paulista General Language, which was spread to other regions by the Bandeirantes; today they have their own dialect, in which some elements of the Paulista and the Galician-Portuguese language have been preserved.

The Caipira people and its culture is considered by intellectuals as an evolution of the old Paulista society and the Bandeirante culture. The areas where Caipira culture was introduced are grouped into a single region known as Paulistânia, a cultural and geographical concept that began to gain prominence in the 20th century.

Among their ancestors are Jews who emigrated from Spain and Portugal during the Inquisition, constituting a people with a significant presence in São Paulo between the 16th and 17th centuries.

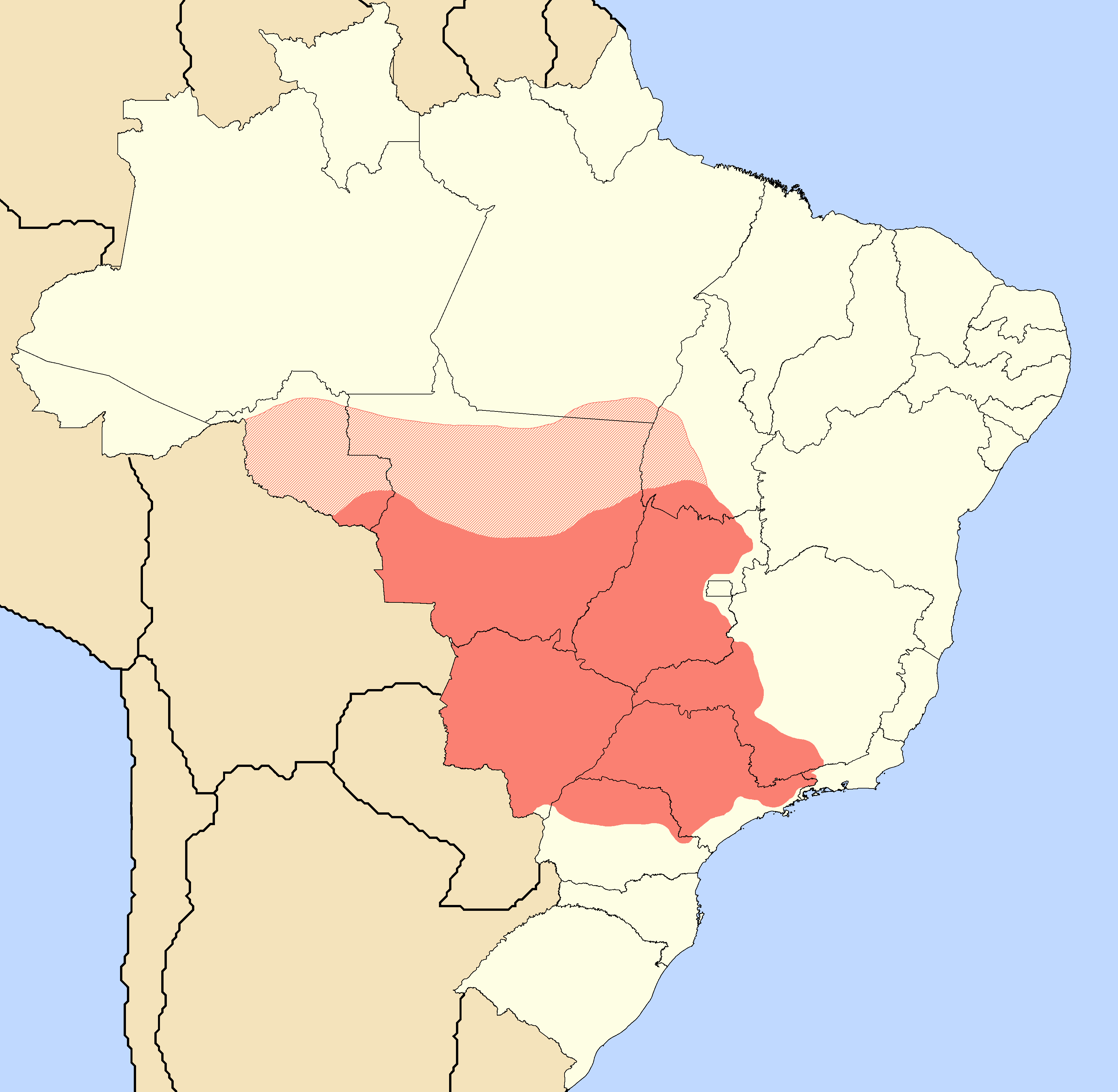
Area inhabited by the Caipira people (red) and areas where they are a considerable minority (pink) over a map of Brazil.

== Origin and etymology ==
The first Caipira were the Bandeirantes, a group of explorers who set out from São Paulo, exploring the backlands in search of metals and precious stones. When they came into contact with the Guaianás, an indigenous people who inhabited the Medio Tietê region, in the interior of São Paulo, they received the name "Caipiras," which became a synonym for Paulista, a similar case to that of the gaucho, which in Brazil became a synonym for Rio-grandense.

There are various theories as to the true meaning of 'Caipira.' The oldest definition was made by Baptista Caetano d'Almeida in the 19th century, describing it as a combination of the terms "cai" (burnt) + "pira" (skin), which in Tupi perhaps describes the tanned or dark skin of the Caipira colonizers.

For Luís de Câmara Cascudo, in his book Dictionary of Brazilian Folklore, published since 1954, the origin may lie in "caá" (jungle) + "pora" (inhabitant), which means "inhabitant of the jungle" in Tupi; the same work, however, describes the Caipira in a stereotyped way, as a "poorly educated man or woman," and erroneously compares them with other peoples, such as the Caiçaras.

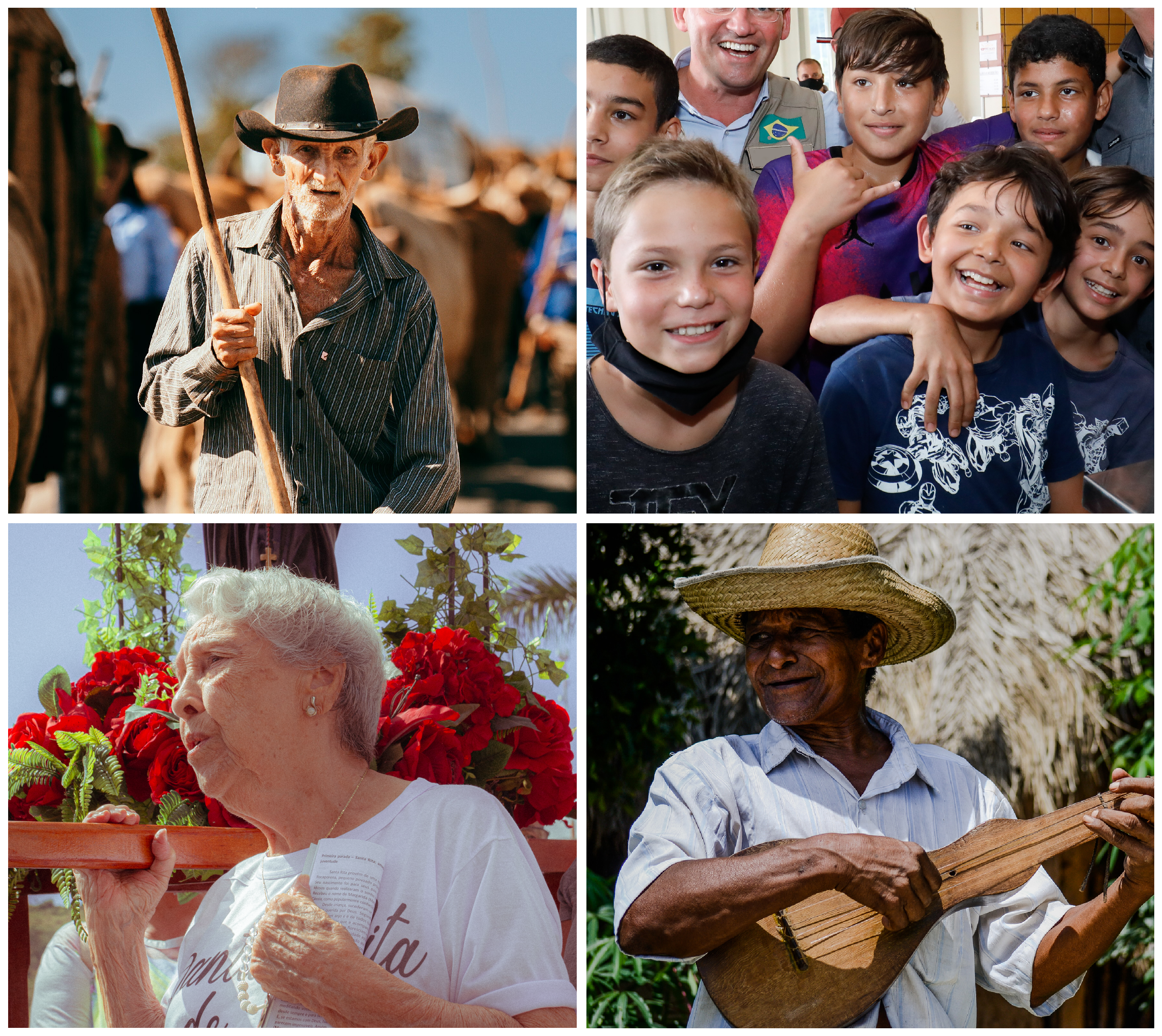
Collage of several caipira people.

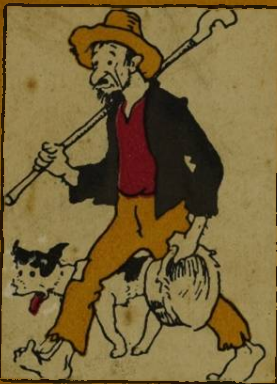
Jeca Tatu, a fictional Caipira man created by Monteiro Lobato.

== Stereotypes ==
The term "caipira" is often used in Brazil in a pejorative, ethnocentric and stereotyped way for populations of the rural areas (mainly in the central and southern regions of the country), as in the book Urupês by Monteiro Lobato, where the caipira is portrayed as an "old plague", "parasite caboclo", "parasite of the earth", "unimportant people", "seminomadic", "unadaptable to civilization", "urumbeba", a term used in the State of São Paulo, to designate a naive and gullible person, easy to be deceived (akin to "rube", "yokel", "hillbilly", "redneck" and "country bumpkin", in the English language), with synonyms like matuto and jeca (named after Jeca Tatu, a Caipira character of Monteiro Lobato), but it can also be used as a self-identifier without negative connotations (akin to "melungeon"). In the traditional June Festivals (Festas Juninas), people are dressed in simple countryside attire, generally stereotyped as representing the Caipira people.

The Brazilian Portuguese term “caipira” is not a complete or exact translation of words such as “rube”, “yokel”, “hillbilly”, “country bumpkin”, or “redneck”, because each of these terms refers to people from different places, cultural backgrounds, and historical contexts. However, they share some partial similarities, as they are generally used in a pejorative way to describe people from rural areas, the countryside, or very small towns, often portraying them as having simpler lifestyles, less refined habits, and limited familiarity with the modern conveniences and cultural trends associated with large urban areas. The overlap exists mainly in the stereotype of someone perceived as rural, traditional, or disconnected from urban modernity.

== Genetics ==
According to the 2022 Brazilian census 35 to 40% of people in the area inhabited by Caipiras self-identified as pardo, 50 to 55% as white, 6 to 8% as black and 1% as East Asian. A 2019 systematic scoping review of 51 studies analyzed the autosomal DNA composition of people from various cities and states across Brazil, the results for the Caipira territory were as follows:

Location of sample collection	European ancestry	African ancestry	Amerindian ancestry
Mato Grosso do Sul	59%	26%	15%
Araraquara	76%	18%	12%
Botucatu	74%	12%	9%
Campinas	73%	20%	7%
Ribeirão Preto	86%	9%	4%

== Famous fictional Caipiras ==
- Chuck Billy (Chico Bento in Brazil) – a Caipira boy created by the cartoonist Mauricio de Sousa
- Jeca Tatu – a Caipira man created by Monteiro Lobato

== See also ==
- Caipira culture
- Caipira dialect
- Caipira guitar
- Caipira music
- Caipirinha, alcoholic drink whose name is a diminutive of caipira.
- Caiçaras
- Caboclos
- Gauchos
- Sertanejo people
- Ribeirinhos

== General and cited references ==
- Cândido, Antônio. Os parceiros do Rio Bonito Sp, José Olympio, 1957.
- Monteiro Lobato, José Bento de. Urupês, Editora Monteiro Lobato e Cia., 1923.
- Nepomuceno, Rosa. Música Caipira, da roça ao rodeio, Editora 34, 1999.
- Queiróz, Renato da Silva. Caipiras Negros no Vale do Ribeira, Editora da USP, 1983.
- Pires, Cornélio. Conversas ao pé do fogo – IMESP, edição fac-similar, 1984.
