= Festa Junina =

June celebration in Brazil

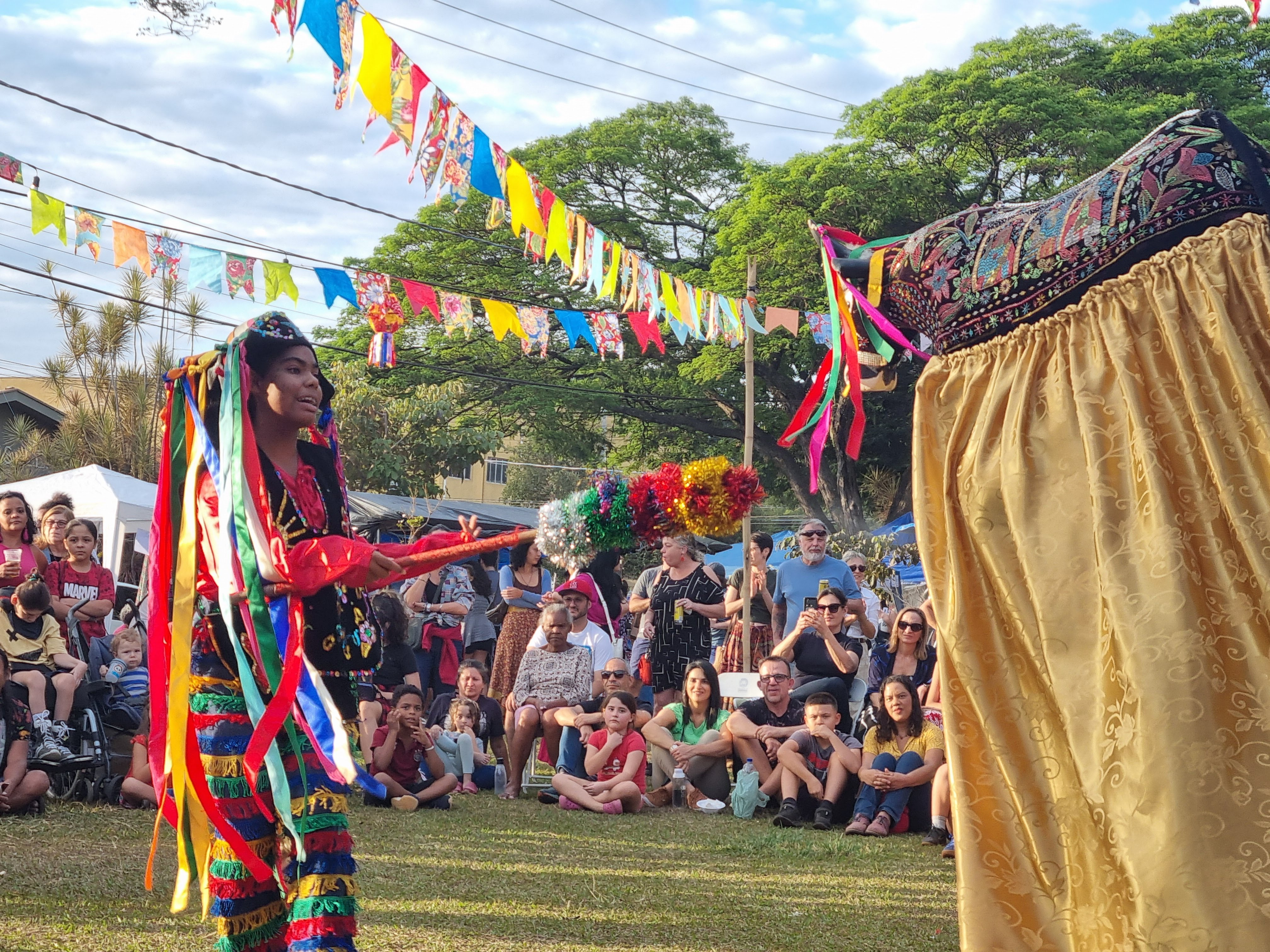
- Festa Junina in Campinas, São Paulo
- Observed by: Brazilian Catholics
- Type: Christian festive
- Begins: 1 June
- Ends: 30 June
- Frequency: Annual

Festas Juninas (Brazilian Portuguese: [ˈfɛstɐs ʒuˈninɐs]; "June Festivals/Festivities"), also known as festas de São João (Brazilian Portuguese: [ˈfɛʃtɐ(s) ˈdi ˈsɐ̃w ʒuˈɐ̃w]; "Saint John's Day festivals") for their part in celebrating the nativity of St. John the Baptist (June 24), are annual Brazilian midwinter celebrations. They were introduced by the Portuguese during the colonial period (1500–1822), and are celebrated nationwide in June. The festivals are mainly celebrated on the eves of the Catholic solemnities of Saint Anthony, Saint John the Baptist, and Saint Peter.

== Introduction ==
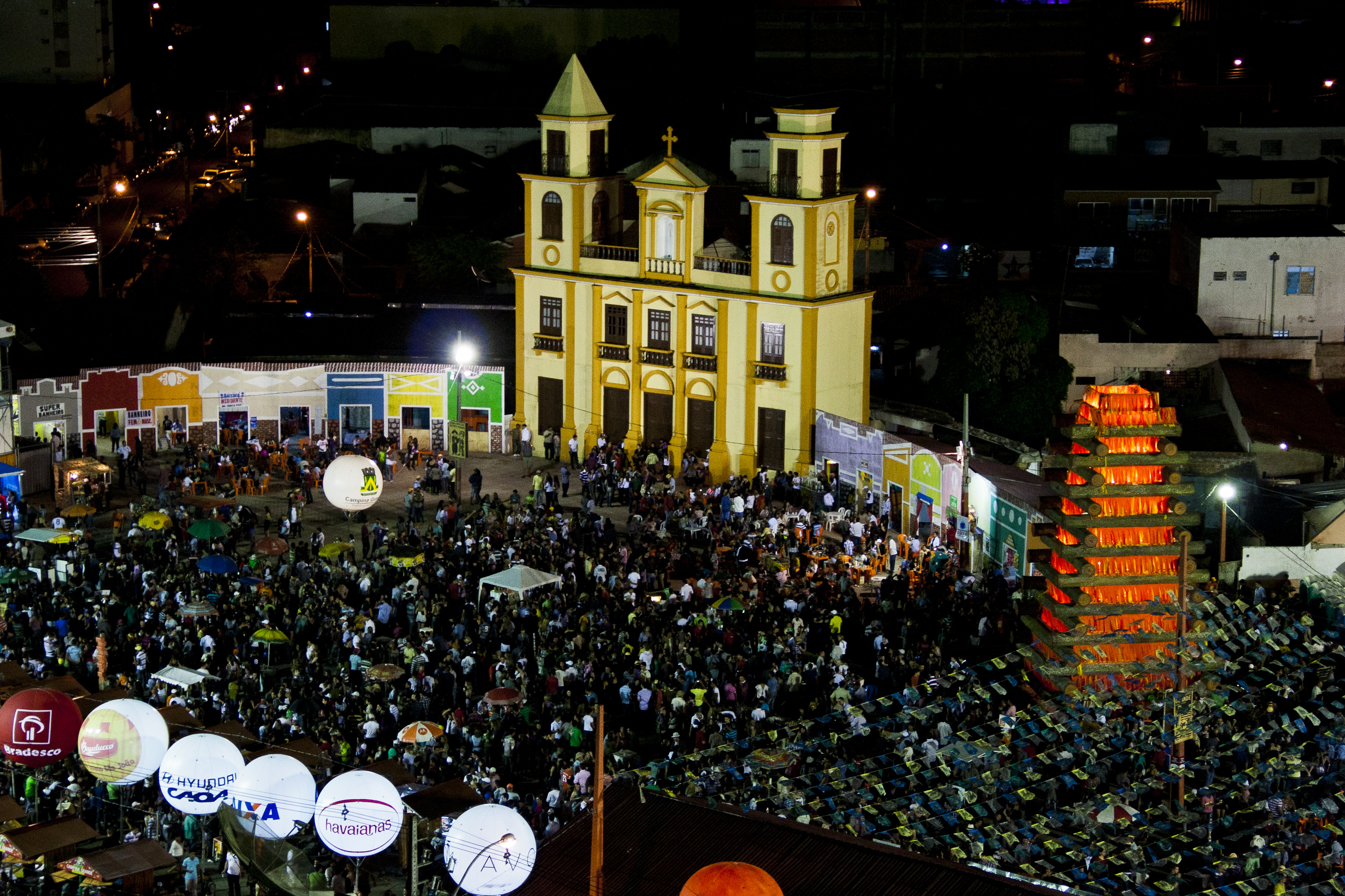
June festival in Campina Grande, Paraíba, Brazil.

Various aspects of the festival originate from the European midsummer celebrations, such as a large bonfire and a maypole decorated with colorful string pennant flags around which people dance. Many of these celebrations now occur with influence from Brazilian rural society. The festivities usually take place in an arraial, a huge tent with a thatched roof that was reserved for important parties in older Brazilian rural areas. The Brazilian climate differs greatly from that of Europe, and Brazilian participants often used the festival as a way to show gratitude for rain. A large bonfire, known as a fogueira, is lit during the festival; this originates from a Catholic story of a fire being lit to inform Mary about the birth of St. John the Baptist, and thus to have her assistance after childbirth Elizabeth would have to light a fire on a hill. Most festivals occurred away from the coast, closer to the many larger plantations in the interior. During Portuguese rule coastal cities, in Pernambuco especially, became industrialized and saw much greater economic prosperity. Hoping to further this growth, King Dom João modified his economic policy to favor cities such as Recife rather than rural interests. Though the Festa Junina continued, its practice in modern cities became much larger. Today, the sizes of the celebrations have surpassed those of Europe. Although they are primarily practiced and hosted by schools, many cities host their own major celebration. In Caruaru, Pernambuco, approximately 1.5 million people attended a celebration of the festival in 2011, a Guinness World Record for the largest celebration of the festival.

== Traditions ==
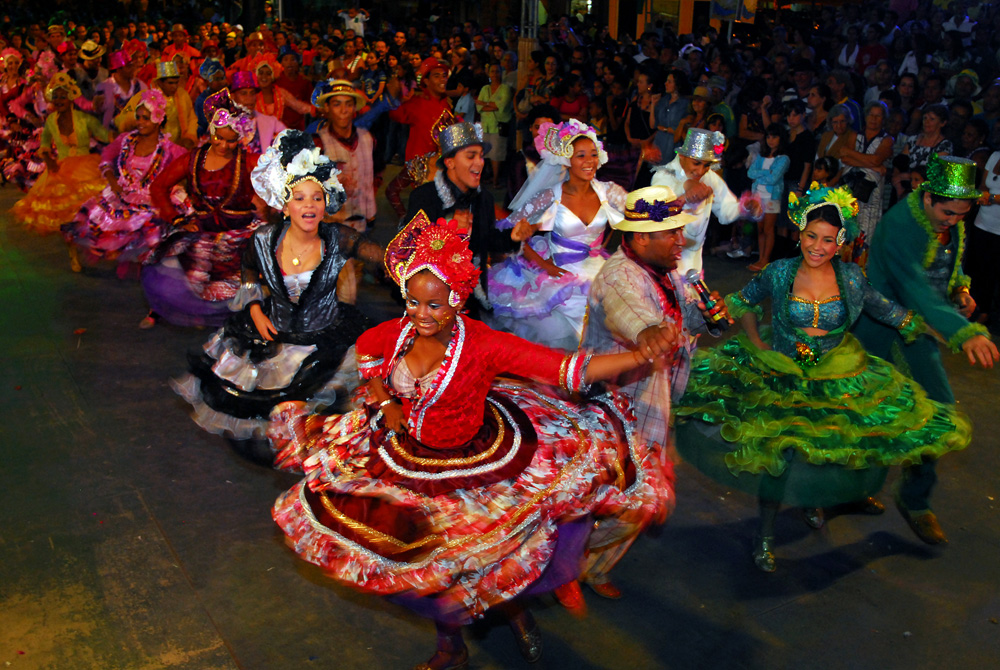
"Quadrilha" or square dance in Sergipe, Brazil

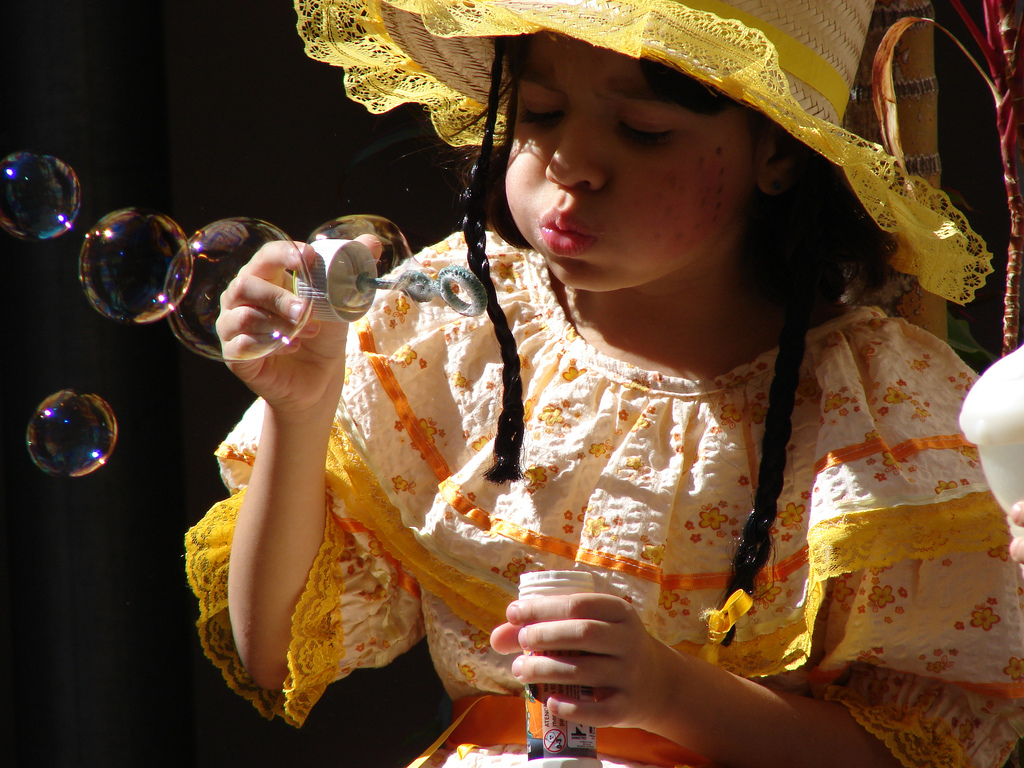
Girl in traditional clothes

In Brazil, the festival is primarily practiced by rural farmers. Men dress up as farm boys with large straw hats and women wear pigtails, freckles, painted gap teeth and red checked dresses.

Dances throughout the festival surround "quadrilha". Most of these dances emerge from 19th-century Europe, which were brought by the Portuguese. The "quadrilha" features couple formations around a mock wedding whose bride and groom are the central focus of the dance. This reflects the fertility of the land. There are various types of dance within the category of quadrilha. Cana-Verde, a subcategory of fandango dance styles, are more popular in the south and are primarily improvised. Dances involving Bumba Meu Boi are also present during this festival. Here, the dance revolves around a woman wanting to eat the tongue of an ox. Her husband kills the ox, to the dismay of the ox's owner. A healer enters and resuscitates the ox, and all participants celebrate.

Another popular dance is the "dança das fitas" (maypole dance), in which a tall pole is decorated with colorful ribbons. Dancers, usually children or young adults, each hold a ribbon and move in patterns around the pole, weaving the ribbons into intricate designs. This vibrant and interactive dance often symbolizes community and unity.

In the Northeast, accompanying these dances is a genre of music known as Forró. This traditional genre primarily uses accordions and triangles, and focuses on the life and struggle of Sertanejo people. The music greatly focuses on saudade, a feeling of nostalgia or forlorn, for rural farm life. More modern versions of the music can include guitars, fiddles, and drums.

Many games targeted at children are present at Festa Juninas, especially at festivals hosted in schools serving as a fundraiser.

- Pescaria: (fishery): Children use a fishing rod to pick up cans or paper designed to look like fish from a box.
- Corrida do Saci: Children hop on one leg to the end of a line in a race, mimicking the movement of the Saci-pererê.
- Corrida de três pés: A three-legged race, where two participants tie one of their legs to their partner's leg, and race others.
- Jogo de argolas: (ring toss): Rings are thrown onto bottles in an attempt to land around the neck.
- Tiro ao Alvo (dart toss): Darts are thrown in an attempt to gain the most points.

Winners of these games are often given miscellaneous prizes, usually toys or food.

== Modern criticisms ==
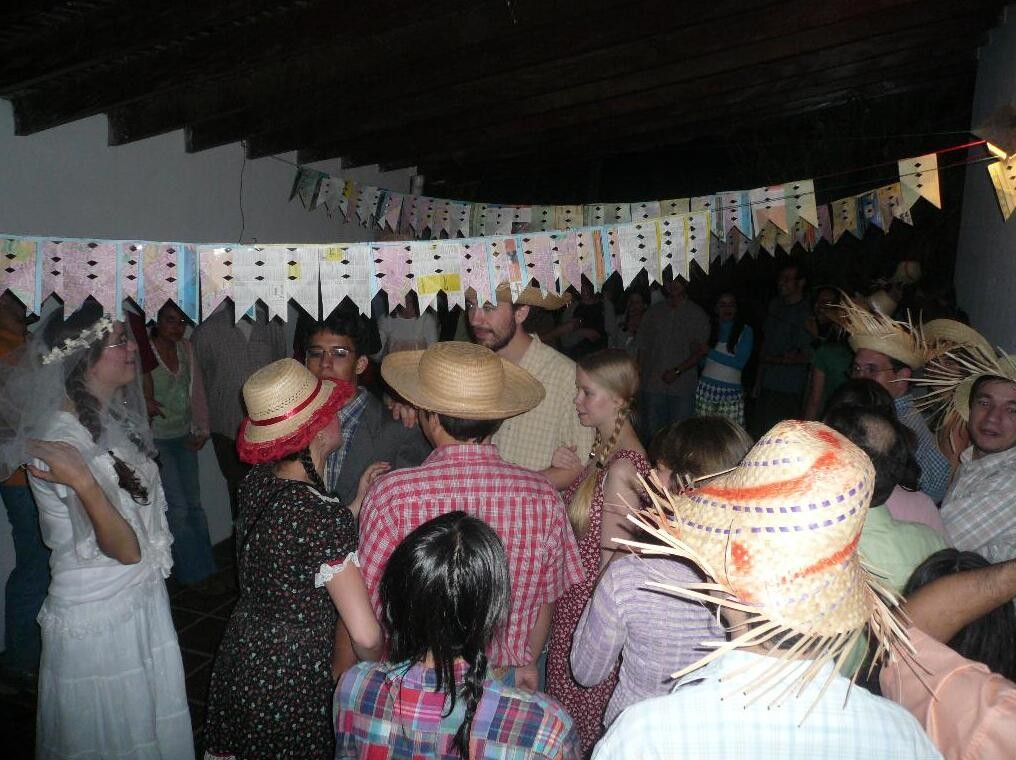
People in stereotypical costumes to simulate a wedding

For experts, although there are many references to the Caipira people, the June festivities don't represent Caipira culture very well, and are full of stereotypes. In many schools, children and young people are encouraged by teachers to dress up in patched clothes, straw hats, missing teeth and moustaches, in reference to rural workers, and stereotypically associated with the Caipira people, who are treated as clumsy, inelegant and unprepared for urban life.

Anxieties over the changing meaning of the festival also reflect a growing "carnivalization" of the tradition. Rather than an emphasis on religion, the festival is presented as a massive gathering for both Brazilians and tourists with large concerts in major cities.

== See also ==
- Festa de São João do Porto, in Portugal
