= Caipira culture =

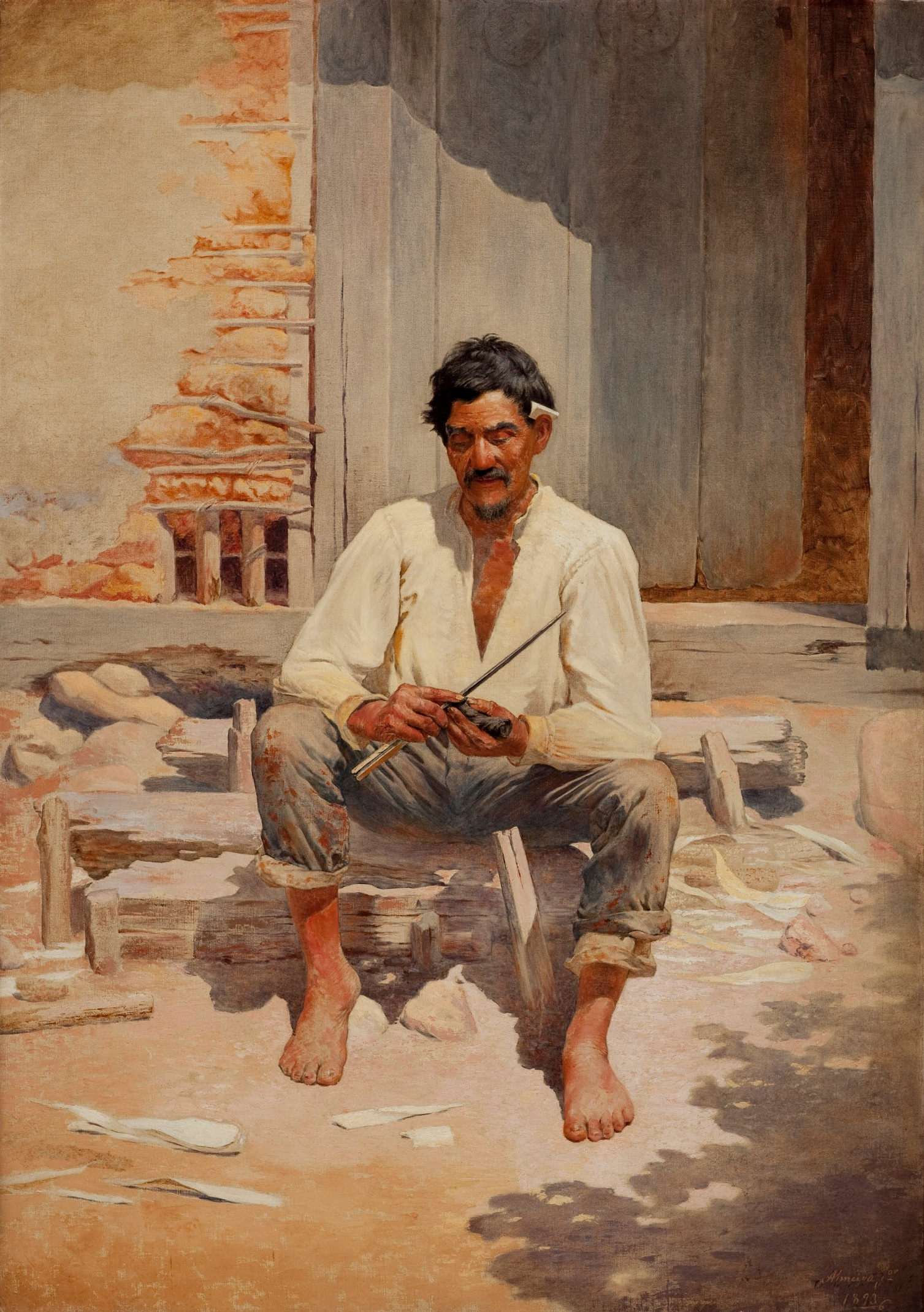
"Caipira picando fumo", by Almeida Júnior, 1893

The Caipira culture refers to the traditional characteristics of the state of São Paulo and regions initially influenced by Paulista exploration activities, geographically considered part of the cultural region of Paulistania, which encompasses Brazilian states such as Paraná, Goiás, Minas Gerais, Mato Grosso, and Mato Grosso do Sul, being these the main places where the values of the Caipira people settled. These are the main areas where the values of the caipira people settled. Historians view it as the continuation of the culture of the bandeirantes, who later distanced themselves from their former tasks related to gold exploration, expansionism, and slavery.

== History ==
The origins of caipira society date back to the 16th century, emerging as a consequence of the movement known as bandeirismo, undertaken by men with the objective of pioneering the unexplored territories of South America. According to the book Os parceiros do Rio Bonito by Antônio Candido, it was through the geographic expansion of the Paulistas, between the 16th and 18th centuries, that the initial characteristics of the colonizers evolved into a subcultural variant of the Portuguese lineage, designated as caipira culture.

The earliest forms of caipira society were sustained by a subsistence economy, coupled with techniques designed to balance the group's relationship with the environment, a characteristic derived from the cultural heritage received by the caipiras. Caipira social life preserved its origins through a fusion of Portuguese heritage and the traditions of the land's indigenous inhabitants, manifested in the semi-nomadic and adventurous lifestyle that shaped the settlement patterns, diet, and character of the Paulistas. Thus, the bandeirismo movement, characterized by incessant mobility and shifting cultivation, came to define the gathering, hunting, and fishing activities of the caipira descendants from the 18th century onward.

The successive adaptations undergone by the frontiersman during the era of the bandeirantes led the life of the early caipira to assimilate and preserve its nomadic and adventurous origins, fostering a fusion between Iberian and indigenous cultures. The nature of this semi-nomadic economy left its mark on the housing, cuisine, and character of the caipiras from São Paulo. From the 16th to the 18th century, this lifestyle, predominantly characterized by the isolation and rustic nature of rural existence, represented a closed economy focused on self-sufficiency and supported by neighborhood clusters, within which the accumulation of capital made no sense. Beginning in the 19th century, caipira culture witnessed the rise and consolidation of the capitalist economic model, driven by the Industrial Revolution, which contributed to profound transformations in the way of life of both urban and rural populations. This shift manifested the symptoms of the social and cultural crisis that society continues to experience to this day; consequently, the caipira of this second historical period underwent significant changes. First, as small-scale farmers could no longer fully provide for their own dietary needs, they were compelled to turn to commercial establishments in the local village, thus integrating into the urban commercial system and embracing the need for capital accumulation to acquire material goods and new technologies that facilitated agricultural labor, thus putting an end to the regime of self-sufficiency. Furthermore, caipira culture was characterized by a vibrant and significant recreational-religious life that played a central role within its social organization. Festivals and weekend church attendance fostered social interaction, distinguished by dietary and religious customs, a distinct dialect, and musical traditions highly unique to this group.

== Dwellings and clothing ==
Dwellings are situated at varying distances from each other, forming small settlements known as arraiais (hamlets); the territory associated with such a cluster is linked to the grouping itself, thereby constituting a distinct unit separate from others.

The primitive accommodations of 1713 consisted of a rancho, also referred to as an abrigo feito (shelter), constructed from straw laid over wattle-and-daub walls; subsequently, low-slung houses were built using wooden slats bound together with woven vines and plastered with mud.

A caipira's home in the 20th century was a rustic dwelling, serving as the core of a small residential system. Personal hygiene activities took place outside the living quarters, using a system involving a water spout for bathing and washing clothes. Corn and coffee were stored in an external granary; only rice and beans were kept inside the house itself. Attached to the living quarters were a wood-burning stove and a clay oven. Furthermore, there were various ancillary structures and features, such as pigsties, brooding coops, manual mills, a standing mortar and pestle, vegetable gardens, and fruit trees. Clothing was fashioned from cotton yarn woven by women. Knee-length smocks served as the standard garment for both boys and girls. Women typically dressed in blouses and skirts, while men wore long underdrawers and shirts. They customarily went barefoot or wore homemade espadrilles, and spent their leisure time smoking pipes and swinging in hammocks.

Initially, household utensils were handmade by each household for themselves; later, however, they could be purchased in the shops of nearby villages—items such as clay pots, wooden spoons, and the like. Illumination was provided by clay or oil lamps fueled by castor oil or lard.

== Labor and social structure ==
In Os Parceiros do Rio Bonito, Antonio Candido describes the structure of caipira society as being represented by a grouping of families, ranging from a few to many, bound together by various ties: location, convenience, practices of mutual aid, or recreational and religious activities. Within these groups, the sense of belonging depended not only on geographic location, but also on the interchange among families, an interaction characterized primarily by collective labor involving reciprocal obligations. It was common for large groups of people, men and women alike, to gather for work; this practice was known as "mutirão" (derived from the indigenous term "muchiron"), and it was applied to agricultural tasks as well as domestic industries (such as spinning cotton thread). In early *caipira* society, food was produced primarily for self-consumption and rarely reached the market, as commercial trade was virtually non-existent.

The rhythm of life was dictated by the daily cycle of work and rest. People typically rose at 5:00 a.m., working approximately 12 hours during the summer and 10 hours during the winter. The weekly rhythm, in turn, was dictated by the lunar cycle; thus, on weekends, people would typically attend festivals and church services, or travel to a nearby village to socialize. The agricultural year served as the primary unit of time, beginning in August with the Feast of Saint Roch (on the 16th) and concluding in July with the Feast of Saint John (on the 24th).

Types of work and exchange:

remuneration in labor remuneration in kind exchange of services collective labor mutirão

== Social life ==
The festive aspect constitutes one of the key elements of caipira cultural life. Following a mutirão, a communal work party, would be hosted by the beneficiary, complete with food and festivities to mark the conclusion of the work. There is no direct remuneration involved; instead, the beneficiary incurs a moral obligation to provide assistance whenever called upon. Neighborly cooperation served as the limit of this mutual aid.

== Dialect ==
See main article: Caipira dialect Caipira culture is distinguished by its own unique dialect—marked by a rustic singularity—which thus constitutes a defining characteristic of the caipira way of being.

Many of the sounds found in the caipira dialect can be attributed to the influence of the Tupi language, in which sounds of the letters d, f, l, v, and z do not exist, and of Guarani, which lacks phonemes for the letters b, d, f, l, and z. They were adopted by the caipiras during the time when Paulista General Language was spoken in the area. due to the phonetic absences in these languages, the caipira people continue substitute many sounds, notably the ‘L’ with ‘r’ and ‘lh’ with ‘i’. In the dialect the word "mulher" (woman) is pronounced as "muié", "folha" (leaf) as "foia", "baude" (bucket) as "barde", etc.

Another characteristic worth noting is the fact that caipira speech possesses a distinct tone of its own—one that generally consists of slow phrasing, devoid of significant variation or musicality.

== See also ==
- Caipira music
- Caipira dialect
