= Paulistas =

Inhabitants of the state of São Paulo, Brazil

- Paulista flag created and officially adopted by São Paulo in 1946

Total population
- c. 46 million

Regions with significant populations
- São Paulo 44,000,000
- Brazil: 2,000,000
- USA: 80,000
- Japan: 40,000
- Spain: 19,000

Languages
- Predominantly spoken: Caipira dialect; Paulistano dialect; Historical: General Paulista; Italo-Paulista

Religion
- Predominantly Roman Catholic

Related ethnic groups
- Caipiras, Caiçaras, Italians, Portuguese, Spaniards, Brazilian indigenous and others

The Paulistas are the people who come from the Brazilian state of São Paulo. During the colonial period, it became synonymous with the term Caipira, and centuries later, due to its historical relationship with the bandeiras, with São Paulo being the cradle of several explorers and their starting point, the term Bandeirante also came to serve as a synonym to designate them; São Paulo, likewise, came to be known as the Bandeirante state. The population is known for its rich diversity of cultural and religious manifestations, with the interior of São Paulo being the place of origin of the Caipira culture (including the Caipira dialect, cuisine and Caipira music), and its coastline, the cradle of the Caiçara culture.

The Paulista language, of Tupi origin, but with elements of Portuguese, Spanish and Guarani, was their native language for many years; in addition to São Paulo, it was also spoken in Paraná, Minas Gerais, Mato Grosso and Goiás due to the influence of the Bandeirantes, but gradually fell into disuse with external cultural influence, until it disappeared at the beginning of the 20th century, being one of the origins of the Caipira dialect, which went on to preserve various terms.

Due to conflicts, in the 18th century there was a large diaspora of Paulistas who lived in the region that now corresponds to Minas Gerais, and many of them settled in the Center-West of Brazil, contributing to the spread of the Caipira culture and the natural formation of a Paulista/Caipira cultural region called Paulistânia. Estimates suggest that more than 2 million Paulistas are spread throughout Brazil, with 680,000 living in the South, 600,000 in other states in the Southeast, 530,000 in the Northeast, 490,000 in the Midwest and more than 90,000 in the North; in countries such as the United States, more than 80,000 live legally, in Japan another 40,000 live, and around 19,000 are in Spain.

“Race of giants” in Portuguese: raça de gigantes is an epithet referring to the old Paulista explorers, used by the French naturalist Augustin Saint-Hilaire when describing the challenges they endured during their expeditions into the backcountry. In the 20th century, the term was invoked in works referring to a historiographical lineage that argued in favor of the biological and political superiority of the Paulista people.

== History ==
=== Origin ===
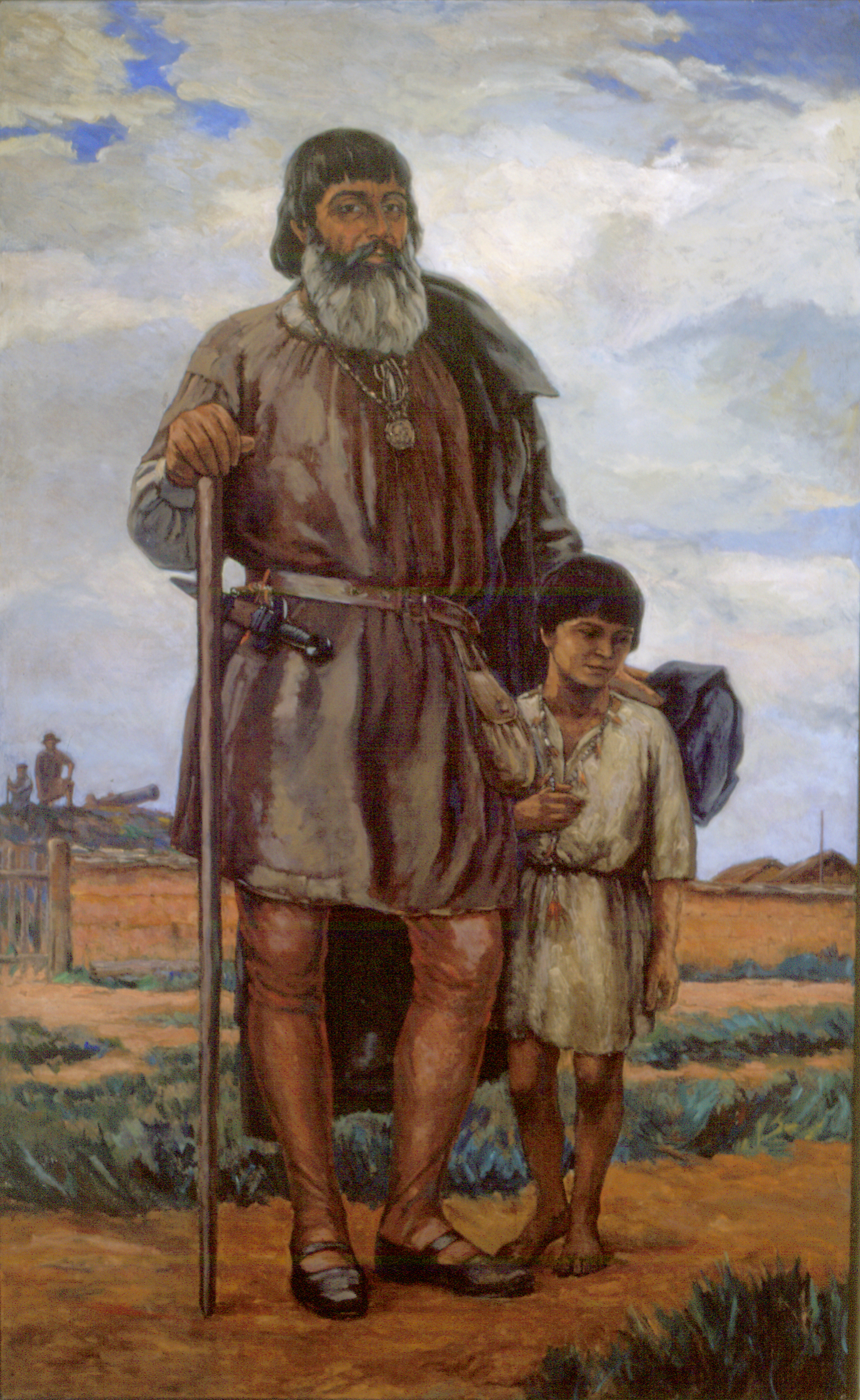
João Ramalho and son

The Paulista history begins with the arrival of João Ramalho Maldonado, a Portuguese adventurer and explorer born in Vouzela. Considered the first Bandeirante by Alfredo Ellis Jr., one of the pioneers in studies on Paulistania, Ramalho left continental Portugal for Terra de Vera Cruz when Catarina Fernandes das Vacas, his wife, was pregnant; the reasons why he left Europe are not known. Living in the Paulista lands probably since 1508, twenty-four years before the beginning of the Portuguese colonization in the region, he soon adapted to the land and the indigenous, coming to know Tibiriçá, a chief who became his friend.

Ramalho got together with the Indian Bartira, Tibiriçá's daughter. The wedding ceremony followed an Indian tradition, and a partnership was established between Bartira's father and João Ramalho, to the point that Tibiriçá would do nothing without first consulting his son-in-law. Even though he was Portuguese, Ramalho was totally indigenized, his life and his children's lives imitated the Indians'. Ramalho had many wives besides Bartira, his children dated sisters and had children with them, went to war with the Indians and their parties were Indian parties, they lived naked like the Indians themselves. Because he was not married on paper, he had problems with the Jesuits, being expelled from a mass and later excommunicated by the Catholic Church.

With the union of Ramalho and Bartira, a large family of Caboclos was born, which spread through generations, thus giving rise to the first Paulistas, who, due to the poverty of the Piratininga Fields as well as the poverty of the Capitania of São Vicente itself in the beginning, gave rise to many future Bandeirantes who would explore the South American backlands, expand the Paulista territory and spread its culture.

Due to his role in the initial colonization of the São Paulo region, João Ramalho came to be recognized as the father of the Paulistas or the founder of Paulistanity. In the 20th century, their descendants also became known as Quatrocentões. In addition to several Bandeirantes, illustrious figures such as Queen Silvia of Sweden, the regent of the Empire of Brazil Diogo Feijó, and presidents Getúlio Vargas and Prudente de Morais are examples of personalities who descend from João Ramalho and Bartira.

=== Colonial and imperial period ===
As the Bandeirantes gained power and the vice-kingdom of Brazil developed, the Portuguese element predominated in the population, the Indians being either absorbed or killed. But the Captaincy of São Vicente, enlarged by the bandeiras to include Mato Grosso, Goiás, Paraná and Santa Catarina, remained undeveloped, having neither the gold of Minas Gerais nor the sugar cane of Pernambuco, two of the most lucrative products in the 16th, 17th, and 18th century. As a consequence, it did not receive the same influx of black slaves during the 16th and 17th centuries as the more prosperous provinces of Brazil. Nevertheless, the number of black slaves increased substantially in São Paulo during the Brazilian Empire, as the slave traffic reached its peak during the first half of the 19th century. After the abolition of the international slave trade in 1850, many more slaves were transferred from declining regions of Brazil to work in coffee plantations.

=== Economic development of São Paulo ===
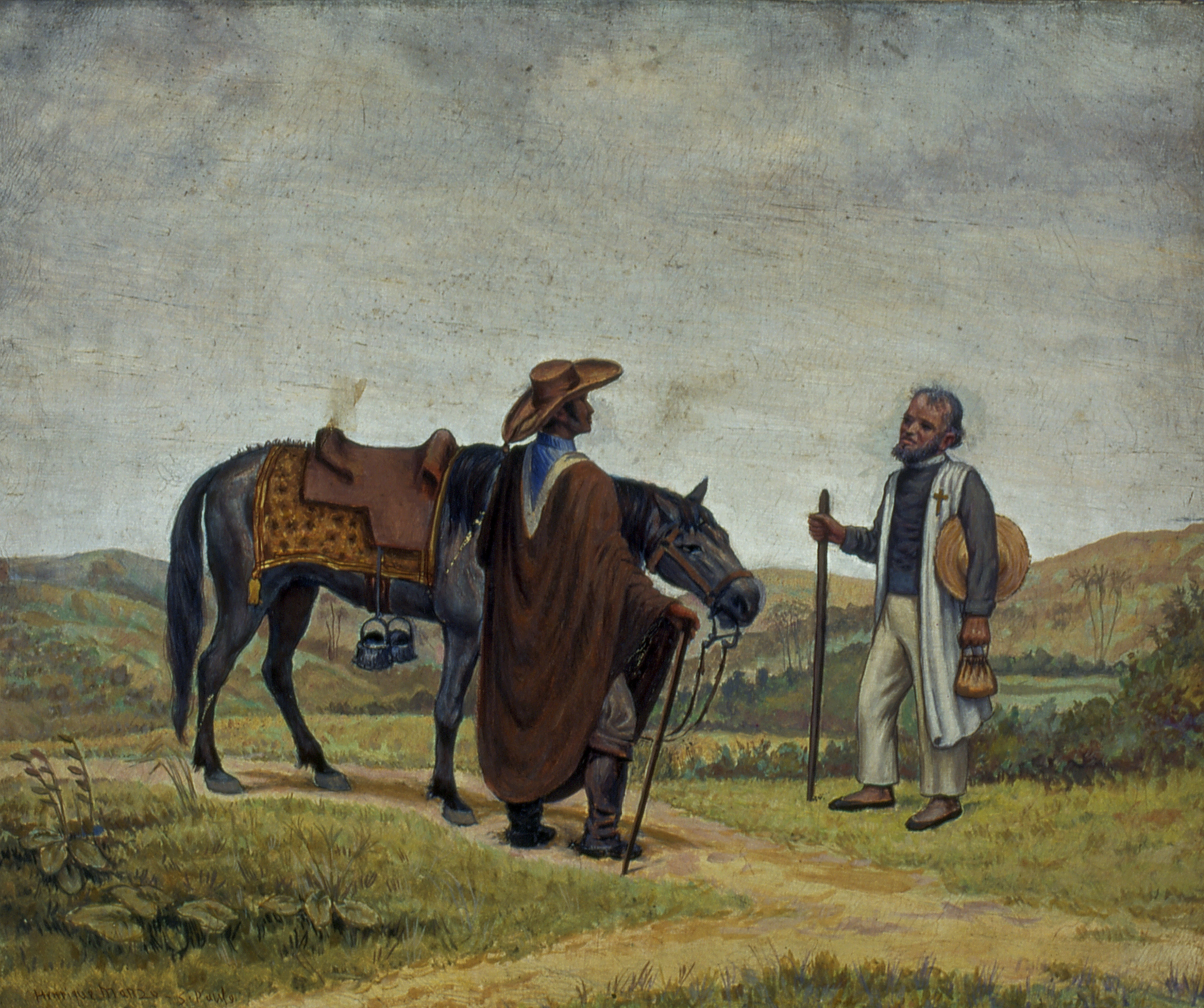
Tropeiro in traditional Paulista costume.

The economic development of São Paulo only really took off with the founding of coffee plantations in the nineteenth century. Those coffee plantations were manned, from the beginning, by slaves, and remained so during most of the 19th century. Not even the abolition of the transatlantic trade changed this, with the coffee barons resorting to the import of slaves from the Northeastern and Southern regions. Both the coffee planters and the Brazilian government, however, were aware that the abolition of slavery could be postponed but not avoided at all; as a result, a few experiments in immigration were tried during this period, and some ideas were discussed, including the immigration of Chinese workers. Only in the 1880s, however, did immigration start in earnest.

From then on, immigration was the solution adopted to what was seen as a labour shortage, and Italian and Spanish immigrants made the bulk of the workers brought to coffee plantations; the reasons why ex-slaves were not employed, or were only marginally employed, are unclear and subject to debate. Much is made of a supposed "whitening" ideology, or even "program", but the cold fact is that, when faced with the impossibility of obtaining European manpower, the coffee barons had no qualms about resorting to Japanese immigrants. A curious fact from this period was the immigration of American Southerners, called Confederados, moving from a country where slavery had been abolished to one where it still existed. Of course, those were not manual workers and did not come to work in coffee plantations.

The wealth produced by coffee culture eventually sparked urbanisation and industrialisation; the growing urban environment attracted even more immigrants, especially Armenians, Italians, Germans, Portuguese, Syrians, and Lebanese. Later, as the foreign immigration declined, a strong chain of internal migration from other regions of Brazil developed.

== Paulista language ==
Initially, the Paulistas, as well as the other populations from Paulista territories, communicated in the Paulista General Language, a creole language formed in the 16th century from ancient Tupi dialects, with influences from the Portuguese and Spanish languages. At the beginning of the 17th century, Paulista bandeiras began a series of raids against the Spanish Jesuit missions in search of Guarani slaves to work in Paulista lands. As a result, the contact established during this period of wars between the Paulistas and the Spanish brought elements of the Guarani language into the language.

Today it has a few registers, being a dead language due to mass immigration and the obligation of the Portuguese language imposed by the governments of Brazil, initially from 1758 on, with a decree by Sebastião José de Carvalho.

== See also ==
- Race of giants
