= Paulistania (region) =

Brazilian cultural region

- Corresponding territories of Paulistania
- Language: Portuguese and Paulist (completely extinct in the 20th century, influencing the Caipira and southern dialects of the Portuguese language)
- Location: South America -Southeast of Brazil -South of Brazil -Central-West of Brazil
- Parts: Goiás; Mato Grosso; Minas Gerais; Mato Grosso do Sul; Paraná; São Paulo Rondônia
- Largest cities: São Paulo (SP); Curitiba (PR); Goiânia (GO); Campo Grande (MS); Uberlândia (MG); Cuiabá (MT) Porto Velho (RO)

Paulistania is the geographical denomination of the Caipira people, being a historical-cultural region. It is made up of the states of São Paulo, Paraná, Minas Gerais, Goiás, Mato Grosso, Mato Grosso do Sul and Rondônia. Its territories were explored by the bandeirantes, becoming a field of Paulista influence and an area of accommodation for its Caipira culture. In addition to the territories that normally make up Paulistania, the Caipira cultural influence evidently reached other states, such as Rio Grande do Sul and Santa Catarina, where the main influence was through tropeirismo, giving rise to the population of birivas, who are its descendants.

The idea of a Caipira cultural region was established thanks to a conservative historiography, linked to the patriotic spirit of intellectuals from São Paulo, who wanted to define a certain territory for the 'Paulista race'. The concept of the region began to be worked on from the 1930s onwards by Alfredo Ellis Jr., and was then contributed to by other intellectuals, such as Antonio Candido, who defined the region as an axis of expansion and diffusion of the bandeirante culture, even making visits between 1952 and 1954 to municipalities in Minas Gerais and Mato Grosso with the aim of establishing comparisons.

== Etymology ==
The name "Paulistania" is a toponym-styled neologism composed of "Paulist" ("Paulo" composed by the Latin suffix "ist", which comes from the ancient Greek suffix "istes" (ιστεσ), defines the native people of São Paulo state, and 'ia', which means "Land" in Latin. The name was created to be interpreted as "Land of the Paulists", as Lusitania, "Land of Lusitans", Germania, "Land of Germans" and Lithuania, "Land of Lithuanians". People from the region can be called both Paulists and Paulistanics.

== History ==
Paulistania would have emerged through bandeirante expeditions on the way to the South American hinterland, giving rise to the Captaincy of São Vicente, later divided into the Captaincy of São Paulo, until reaching the administrative territories, these being parts of the states of Goiás, Mato Grosso do Sul, Mato Grosso, Minas Gerais, Paraná and São Paulo.

Hermes Fontes, in some chronicles written for the Correio Paulistano newspaper between 1917, and 1918, used Paulistania as a synonym for São Paulo. The editor Heitor de Moraes gave Fontes the title: in Moraes ears, "Paulistania" sounded like "Paulist land", just as the Portuguese had their Lusitania and the Germanic peoples their Germania. The term Paulistania was established thanks to a historiography of a conservative nature, linked to the provincial spirit of the Paulists intellectuals, wanting to define a certain territory for the 'Paulist race', a certain territory, it was Alfredo Ellis Júnior. who, from 1930 onwards, worked the most on the concept of a Paulistania.

But it was Joaquim Ribeiro, in his work Folklore dos Bandeirantes, from 1946, who proposed that Paulistania was his term, a neologism created "to designate the living space of the old paulists", a noun to be used, from then on, to make reference to the region that, in his opinion, was "one of the fundamental cells of the territorial formation of Brazil." The author believed that, in addition to being useful, Paulistania was a name that came "against the geographical and historical understanding of the region of bandeirism."

The necessary condition for the expansion of the geographic extension of Portuguese America, the bandeirante expeditions, by themselves, did not become a sufficient condition for the creation of a Paulistania. It was from the bandeirante who, for historical reasons, left and did not return to the Planalto do Piratininga that the "bandeirante region" became a "Paulist Land" and, later, "the vital space of the Paulists." From the fixation to the soil, the São Paulo region emerged; of this, Paulistania; and then, its people, culture, experience history. Although administratively and politically, the boundaries and boundaries of this Paulistania were being changed, reconfigured over time, to unfold in what are now the states of São Paulo, Paraná, Minas Gerais and Goiás, Mato Grosso do Sul and parts Mato Grosso, it can be assumed that the region formed by the "large territory invaded by the bandeiras and entradas" preserved an expressive cultural unit, unified by a common body of understandings, values and traditions in which everyone participated, in a reality in which the variations regional ones never came to threaten the essence of the whole.

It can be said that, from the mid-eighteenth century, a sheet of Caipira culture was spread and consolidated, with local variations, which included, in addition to the Captaincy of São Paulo, parts of the captaincies of Minas Gerais, Goiás, and even from Mato Grosso. Updating the geography, it would not be an exaggeration to say that the route of the Caipira culture expanded and covered the areas that today correspond to several states, including the Missões Region, in the northwest of Rio Grande do Sul, a state strongly influenced by the drovers who left from Sorocaba.

== Culture ==
The basis of Paulistania is the Caipira identity. But unlike other regional cultures, which manifest themselves with pride, such as those of the sertanejo or the gaucho people, the Caipira culture is always ashamed and dissimulated, something that is neither made explicit nor celebrated. Writers Carlos Alberto Dória and Marcelo Corrêa Bastos recall the well-known episode of "revolt of the inhabitants of Cunha", on the occasion of the publication of a book by Emilio Willems, in which he portrayed the inhabitants of that small town in the Paraíba Valley of São Paulo, using of that category. Perhaps it is due to Monteiro Lobato the fixation of this deleterious image of the Caipira, through his character Jeca-Tatu, in Urupês. Even with the mitigating factor that it would not be his fault to be like this, Lobato's redneck is presented as a "'Mumbava', dirty and bad" man, slow, simple, backward, synonymous with the agrarian past to be overcome. In Candido, adjectives give way to less valuable nouns: the Caipira culture is that of sociability marked by a certain form of moral conduct in everyday life, ratified by practices of solidarity predominantly based on obtaining the minimum vital for the subsistence of families, something coherent and consistent with the rusticity and lack inherited from its peripheral condition in the territorial and social formation. The rustic cuisine would then follow this line, based on the precarious, the transitory, the peripheral, the rustic, the simple, the improvised.

=== Musical rhythms ===
The traditional musical rhythm of Paulistania is the Caipira music. In this region and from this culture, a modality of popular music was born, Alberto Ikeda, author of the book Música Na Terra Paulista: From Viola Caipira À Guitarra Elétrica considered it to be "the music of Paulistania". In the author's words, it is a musicality that is related to the historical formation of São Paulo, making it unique as a paulista. In addition to being a symbol, the violão sertanejo was the guarantor of the expansion of this country music. Setting itself up as a spokesperson for this musicality, the instrument spread throughout Paulistania and, having its identification with the first inhabitants of the region as time passed, it reached the point of making the violeiro an individual of great importance in communication. where to live.

Although Caipira music is predominantly related to other expressions, some rhythms ended up also being fixed autonomously, as a musical genre in itself, predominantly for listening, as a popular musical expression of concert, with recognized and expressed authorship. These include: the cururu, the catira/cateretê and the xote, which are originally danced forms, with singing often improvised; the toada and moda de viola, only vocal genres, and the Caipira pagode, initially a type of solo instrumental music, of great virtuosity, performed on the Caipira viola, and which started to be presented also in the sung version.

=== Cuisine ===
Paulistania is the space where the Guarani and the Portuguese met, through the São Paulo flags and the establishment of human settlements, some temporary, others permanent, where both the reciprocal assimilation of the habits of the two social groups took place, as well as differences that, however, they did not erase the common traits, claimed to be fundamental to Caipira cuisine. Among them: the wide and varied use of corn as a fundamental ingredient, the predilection of pork meat over beef, the taste for chicken, preferably Caipira chicken, the diversified use of vegetables, all of this giving the contours of an original and unique flavor. In it, corn and pork reign supreme. The provisional condition of certain stops, in the advance towards the interior, favored the cultivation of this grain, with a shorter cycle than cassava.

Mentioning the authors' record regarding the nuances of Caipira cuisine, exemplified in the assimilation of certain local products such as pequi in savanna areas, pinhão in mountainous areas and further south, or even fish and the more common use of cassava in areas coastal areas, in what is conventionally called caiçara cuisine. But all this as if it were an additional seasoning to a base that imposes itself and only enriches the complexity of this Caipira cuisine. From this common base, local variations emerge: such as the tutu of Minas beans in contrast to the paulists beans virado; pork rice, chicken rice with okra, rice with sausage, pequi rice, all of which come from the habit of mixing rice with locally produced meat or, in the case of pequi, with the fruit, to "enlarge" the food; the barreado of the paranaense coast; the various farofas and the many corn derivatives such as curau, pamonha, cakes and dumplings, viradinho, angus; scrambled foods whose basis is the use of leftovers from lunch or other meals; the empadas and empadões, like the goiano; but also the cambuquiras and preserves that are always present, although in different ways of preparation or with different ingredients here and there.
