= Brás Cubas =

Portuguese explorer

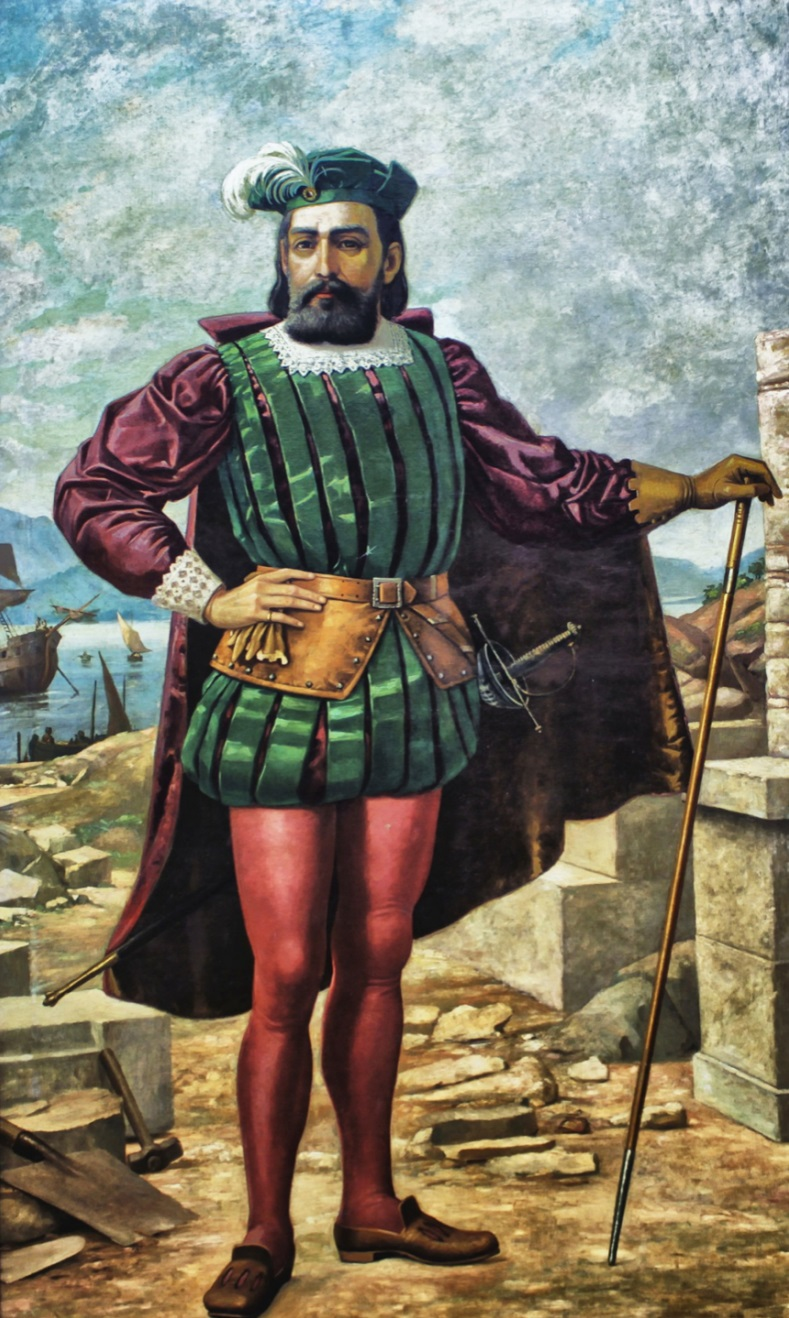
- Portrait of Brás Cubas by Benedito Calixto (1903)

Governor of São Vicente
- In office 1545–1549
- Monarch: John III of Portugal
- Preceded by: Cristóvão de Aguiar de Altero
- Succeeded by: António de Oliveira

Governor of São Vicente
- In office 1555–1556
- Monarch: John III of Portugal
- Preceded by: Gonçalo Afonso
- Succeeded by: Jorge Ferreira

Personal details
- Born: 1507 Porto, Kingdom of Portugal
- Died: 1592 (aged 84–85) Porto, Kingdom of Portugal

Military service
- Allegiance: Portuguese Empire

Brás Cubas (Porto, December 1507 – Porto, 1592) was a Portuguese nobleman, explorer and the founder of Santos, São Paulo. The son of João Pires Cubas and Isabel Nunes, he was twice governor of the Captaincy of São Vicente (1545–1549 and 1555–1556).

He arrived in the Portuguese colony of Brazil in the year of 1531 with Martim Afonso de Sousa, the founder of the Captaincy of São Vicente. The region of Santos was already populated, but it was Brás Cubas who officially founded the village because in 1543, he founded the first Holy House of Mercy, which he called All Saints, a name that would pass to the village, the port of which was better located than the one in São Vicente. He was responsible for the transference of the harbor from Ponta da Praia to the city center, in the environs of Outeiro de Santa Catarina. Besides being the founder of Santos, he organized expeditions for the Crown and was later the governor of the Captaincy of São Vicente.

He was once the biggest land owner of the coastal region. In 1551, was named by John III of Portugal, the Provider and Accountant of the Incomes and Rights of the Captaincy; in the following year, he built the fort of São Filipe in the island of Santo Amaro. He had a memorable participation in the defense of the captaincy against the attacks of the native Tamoios, then allied to the French. Later, on the orders of the third general-governor Mem de Sá, he carried out expeditions through the interior in search of gold and silver. The accounts say he arrived as far as Chapada Diamantina in the outback of Bahia.

His attempts to enslave the natives resulted in a revolt that ended up by determining the appearance of the Tamoio Confederation, that could only be partially contained by the action of the jesuits Manuel da Nóbrega and José de Anchieta.

When he died, he was a nobleman of the Royal House and one of the most respected men in the captaincy. The title of alcaide-mor (mayor) of the village of Santos passed down to his son, Pêro Cubas.
