= Quatrocentão =

Term for some elite families in Brazil

Coat of arms of the city of São Paulo. A reference to the early explorers from the city, and the wealth created by coffee production in the 19th and early 20th centuries.

Quatrocentão (feminine quatrocentona, plural quatrocentões) is a term used to designate members of elite families descendant from the early settlers and explorers of São Paulo. This term was first used in the early 20th century; in the past they were referred to as primeiros povoadores (first settlers) or nobreza da terra (nobility of the land). These families had occupied important positions as governors, military commanders, aldermen and explorers of early colonial South America. They received large land grants from the Portuguese Crown and originated mostly in Portugal and Spain, but some in Flanders and other places in Europe. A portion of the original settlers were noblemen of the Royal House of Portugal. Under the rule of the Habsburgs and the Iberian Union, they were joined by Spanish families, some also of noble origin. The earliest of these settlers married descendants of Martim Afonso Tibiriçá, the Amerindian chief of Piratininga, and after intermarried frequently among the families in the Genealogia Paulistana, forming an endogamous group. They were first listed in a genealogical study in the 1700s by Pedro Taques de Almeida Paes Leme and last listed in the classical genealogical work Genealogia Paulistana, published in 1905.

The quatrocentões and their ancestors were greatly responsible for the expansion of the Portuguese Empire in South America, at the expense of the Spanish Empire. Also the Brazilian Gold Rush, which had strong repercussion in Europe and in the Americas, the founding of many towns in Minas Gerais such as Ouro Preto, and also the first phase of the industrialization of São Paulo during the Empire of Brazil. But also for the maintenance of slavery in Brazil, making Brazil the last country in the Americas to abolish slavery in 1888. In the 19th and early 20th centuries they formed a large portion of the plantation aristocrats and titled nobility of the Empire of Brazil. They became decadent after the financial crisis of 1929, the rise of new wealthy immigrants and the Revolution of 1932, that they lost against Getúlio Vargas, ironically a descendant of these early settlers of São Paulo. Quatrocentões are a polarizing group in Brazilian history, praised by some and blamed by others for their actions during the course of Brazilian history.

Although no longer existing as a strong social group, one can still find among modern descendants of the early settlers of São Paulo many businessmen and members of the political elite in Brazil and elsewhere, both left-wing and right-wing. They include presidents of Brazil; Brazilian senators, deputies and governors; the current royal family of Sweden; a branch of the princes of Löwenstein-Wertheim-Freudenberg and some members of the House of Orléans (Orléans-Braganza branch).

== Meaning of the term ==
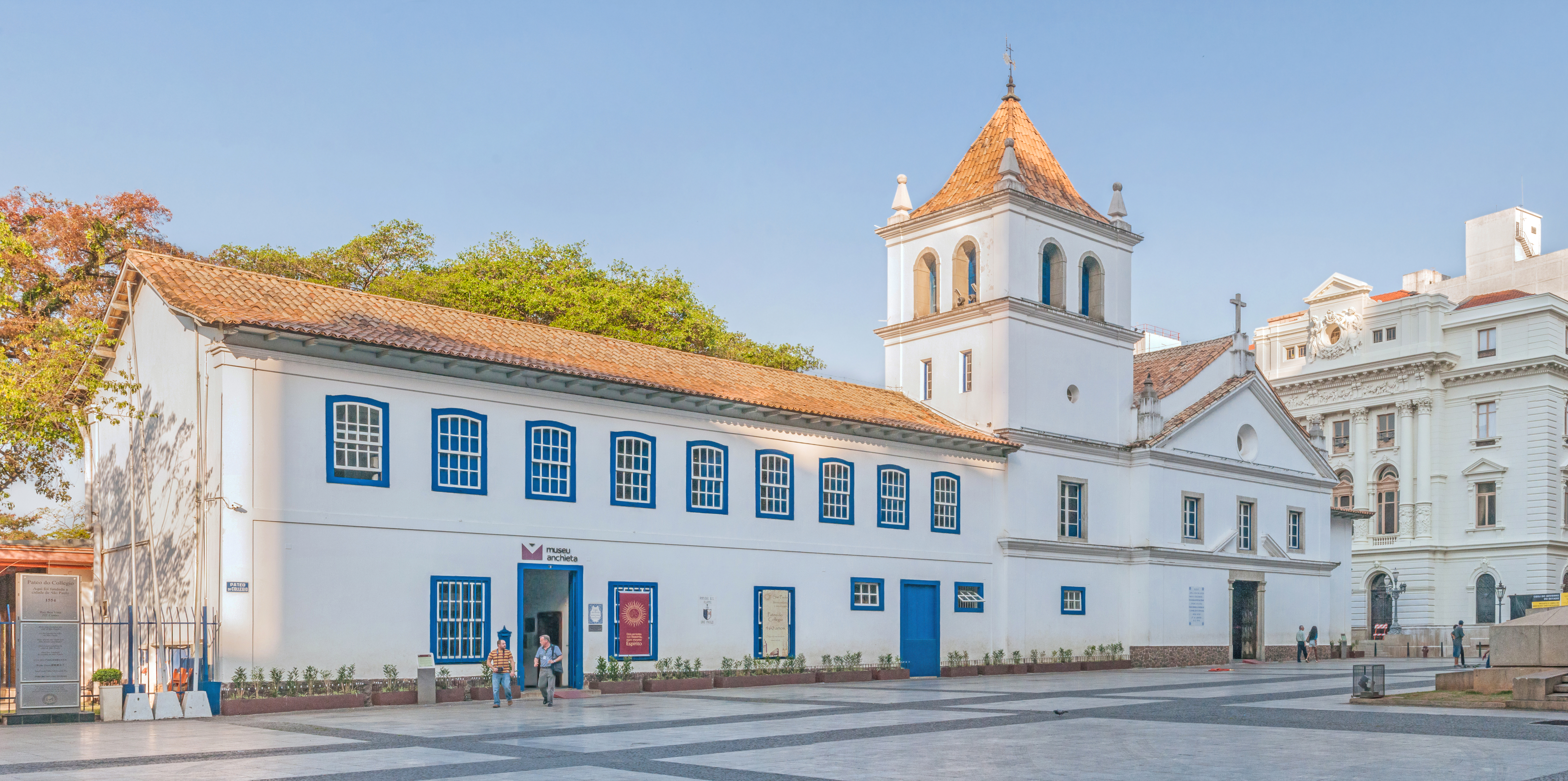
Pátio do Colégio, in the Historic Center of São Paulo. At this location, the city was founded in 1554.

Quatrocentão is the Portuguese language augmentative for four hundred, implying that these families had been in São Paulo for four hundred years in the beginning of the 20th century, when the term became used to distinguish them from recent European and Middle Eastern (Syrian and Lebanese) immigrants.

Italian writer and journalist Corrado Pizzinelli defined them in the following way in 1955:

...they are something more than a noble, of the “true lord”, of the aristocrat, they are the authors and the censors of the Brazilian Gotha Almanach. They are the holders and dispensers of being Brazilian. For them, the world started four hundred years ago, when the first Portuguese and their families, from which they descend, arrived in Brazil. The quatrocentões are lovable, gentle and proud. They have a strong sense of caste and are inaccessible: they constitute 70 percent of the ruling political class of Brazil, they defend themselves by every way from society.

=== Nobreza da Terra ===
The term nobreza da terra, Portuguese for "nobility of the land", was used not only in São Paulo but all over the Portuguese Empire to designate those that had the status of nobility under Portuguese legislation. Beside the fact that they had to live as noblemen, they had to formalize their status by occupying either positions in the Royal Household of Portugal, to have been a knight in the military orders of Portugal, have instituted a majorat, have occupied a position in public administration or to have been a military officer.

== History ==
A number of renowned historians in Brazil had studied the history of the early settlers of S. Paulo and their descendants, including Sérgio Buarque de Holanda, Alfredo Ellis Junior, Caio Prado Júnior, Afonso d'Escragnolle Taunay, Antônio Castilho de Alcântara Machado and Washington Luís Pereira de Sousa. All of them also descendants of these families or married into it.

=== Timeline ===
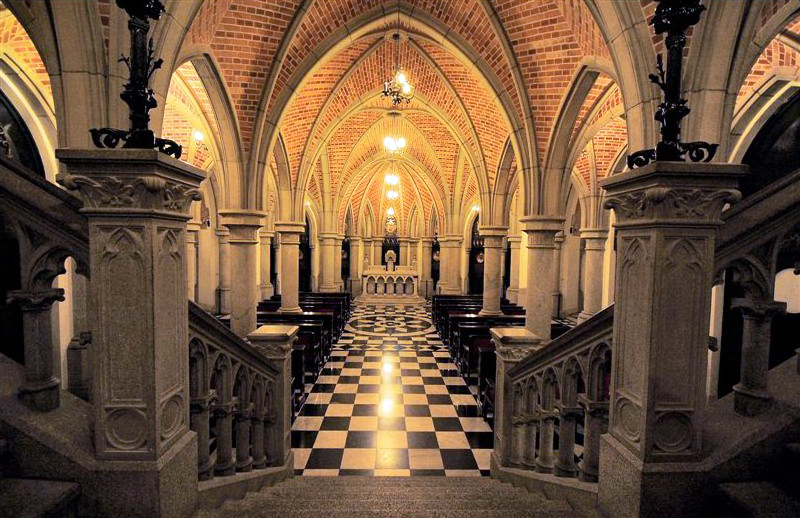
Crypt of Chief Tibiriçá in the São Paulo Cathedral

- 1531 Martin Afonso de Sousa under orders of King Dom João III of Portugal leads a Portuguese armada destined to establish a colony in the Brazilian coast to counter Spanish and French expansion into Portuguese lands. In his armada he brings the first Portuguese families and settlers of São Paulo.
- 1532 São Vicente, in the coast of the modern state of São Paulo, is founded as the first municipality of Brazil and Portuguese America.
- 1534 King Dom João III of Portugal installs a system of hereditary fiefs called captaincies to promote the settling of Brazil. Including the captaincies of São Vicente and Santo Amaro (modern states of São Paulo and Rio de Janeiro). The first was given to Martim Afonso de Sousa, and the second to his brother Pero Lopes de Sousa. The captain-general, in this case Martim Afonso de Sousa, had the right to appoint a lieutenant and Capitão-mor to govern in his place and receive the income from the fiefdom, that was divided among the family of Martim Afonso de Sousa, the appointed acting governor and the Crown.
- 1543 Portuguese nobleman Brás Cubas founded the first Santa Casa da Misericórdia in Santos, the oldest charity organization in the Americas.
- 1553 A fortified village by the name of Santo André da Borda do Campo is founded by João Ramalho. It is officially elevated to a municipal village by Tomé de Sousa and Brás Cubas. It was the first village founded by the Portuguese away from the coast. It was located in the outskirts of what is today the city of São Paulo.
- 1554 Jesuits Manuel da Nóbrega, St. José de Anchieta and others lay the foundations of the Jesuit mission of São Paulo dos Campos de Piratininga. The future city of São Paulo.
- 1560 The municipality of Santo André da Borda do Campo is transferred to São Paulo dos Campos de Piratininga to better defend and settle the area.
- 1562 São Paulo is surrounded and attacked by native tribes against the establishment of the Portuguese and the Jesuits in the area, the troops leading the attack are commanded by Jaguaranho and Chief Piquerobi, nephew and brother of Chief Tibiriçá. Leading the counterattack and defense of São Paulo was Chief Tibiriçá himself. In the course of battle Tibiriçá killed his brother Piquerobi. His nephew Jaguaranho was also killed in battle.
- 1562 Death of Chief Tibiriçá, a couple of months after battle, he is given a solemn funeral rite by the Jesuits, including St. José de Anchieta, and is recognized as founder and protector of São Paulo. He is buried in the crypt of the São Paulo Cathedral.

=== Geographical presence in Brazil ===
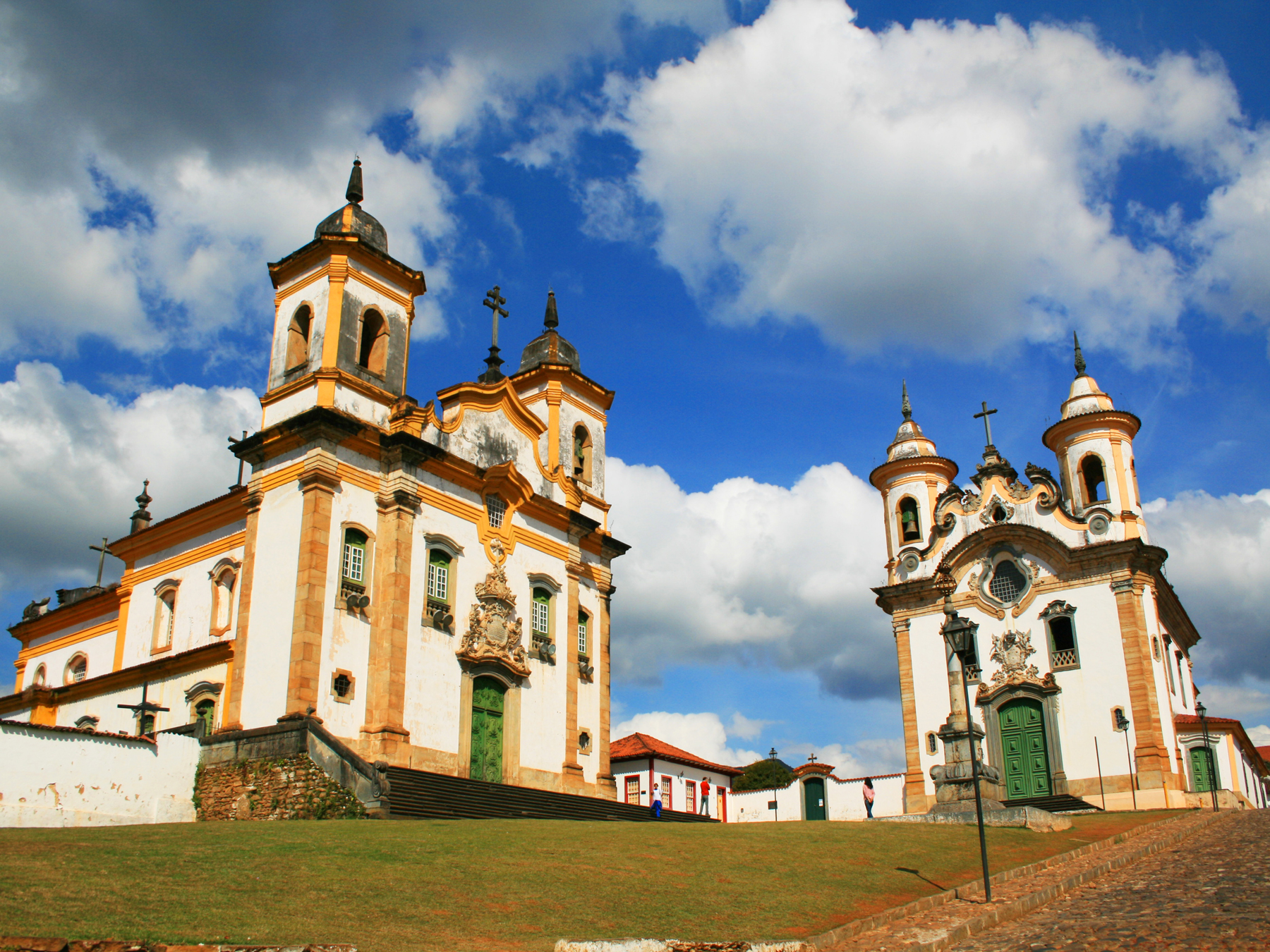
Mariana, one of the towns founded by settlers from São Paulo

Beside their connection to the state of São Paulo, and given the expansionist nature of the early settlers already in the colonial period, today one can find their descendants in the states of Rio de Janeiro, Paraná, Santa Catarina, Rio Grande do Sul, Goiás, Mato Grosso do Sul, Mato Grosso and Minas Gerais. It has been estimated mathematically that around 15 million Brazilians are descendants of these early settlers (less than 10% of the Brazilian population).

== Families in the Genealogia Paulistana ==
These are only the chapter heads chosen by author Silva Leme for his book Genealogia Paulistana, many other families are part of the book, all of them married into these families listed below, an index can be found in the final book with all the families up to 1905.

Family	Origin	Patriarch or Matriarch
Carvoeiros	Portugal - Marinhota, Santa Maria da Carvoeira	Domingos Luiz, Knight of the Order of Christ, founder of the chapel of Luz, predecessor of the Mosteiro da Luz.
Camargos	Spain - Castile	Jusepe de Camargo, according to some sources mentioned in the Genealogia Paulistana he was from Seville.
Buenos da Ribeira	Spain - Seville	Bartholomeu Bueno de Ribeira, arrived in São Paulo with his father, Francisco Ramires de Pórros, in 1571.
Pires	Portugal - Porto	Salvador Pires, arrived in São Paulo in 1531 with his relatives, including his father João Pires and his cousin Jorge Pires, a noble knight of the Royal House of Portugal.
Lemes	Flanders - Bruges	Antão Leme that moved with his family from the Madeira Islands to S. Vicente, the family was of noble origin in Flanders and was also recognized as Portuguese nobility by the King of Portugal. They were among the pioneers in the introduction of sugarcane in South America.
Raposos Góes	Portugal - Lisbon	Antonio Raposo arrived in Brazil with the Armada of Dom Diogo Flores de Baldez. He was knighted by the governor-general of Brazil, Dom Francisco de Souza under a decree of Philip III of Spain in 1601.
Prados	Portugal - Olivença	João do Prado, of well known nobility in Olivença. He arrived in Brazil in the entourage of Martim Afonso de Sousa in 1531.
Penteados	Portugal - Lisbon	Francisco Rodrigues Penteado, born in Pernambuco, Northeast of Brazil. His father Manoel Corrêa, a wealthy merchant from Lisbon established himself in Pernambuco. After becoming bankrupt Penteado abandoned Lisbon where he was and arrived in S. Paulo in the entourage of Salvador Corrêa de Sá e Benevides in 1648.
Pedrosos Barros	Portugal - Algarve	Pedro Vaz de Barros, capitão-mor governor of S. Vicente. Arrived in S. Vicente before 1601 with his brother, Antonio Pedroso de Barros, also a capitão-mor. His sons had their nobility proven in a process by the Crown.
Borges de Cerqueira	Portugal - Mesão Frio	Simão Borges de Cerqueira, moço da câmara (a grade of nobility of the Royal House of Portugal) of King D. Henrique. Occupied the administrative positions of tabelião and escrivão de órfãos, positions with life tenure granted by the Crown, with the right of collecting fees for the office holder.
Arrudas Botelhos	Portugal - Ribeira Grande	Francisco de Arruda e Sá, André de Sampaio e Arruda and Sebastião de Arruda Botelho, three brothers from the Island of S. Miguel arrived in S. Paulo in 1654. Descendants of the fidalgo Gonçalo Vaz Botelho, that was originally from mainland Portugal.
Campos	Belgium	Filippe de Campos Banderborg, captain, was in S. Paulo in 1643, when he got married. The family was originally from Belgium, but was established in Spain and Portugal before arriving in S. Paulo, during the Iberian Union.
Taques Pompeus	Flanders - Duchy of Brabant	Pedro Taques, he was born in Portugal, son of a Flemish nobleman, arrived in Brazil in 1591, in the entourage of governor-general Francisco de Souza, he was the governor's secretary.
Hortas	Portugal - Setúbal	Catharina de Figueiredo d'Horta, of the noble family of the Hortas in Portugal, married in S. Paulo and had issue. She died in S. Paulo in 1621.
Almeidas Castanhos	Portugal - Monte-mor o Novo	Antonio Rodrigues de Almeida, a noble knight of the Royal House of Portugal, by King D. João III, at the time the highest grade of nobility in the Royal House, was first in S. Vicente in 1547. He was capitão-mor governor of S. Vicente and Ouvidor. He is also considered an important figure in the first years of Portuguese Rio de Janeiro.
Tenorios		Martim Fernandes Tenorio de Aguilar, of noble ancestry, was capitão-mor of troops, famous explorer and member of the administration. He died in the 1603, during an expedition to the Parana River.
Quadros	Spain - Seville	Bernardo de Quadros, of noble descent from Seville. In S. Paulo, he was Provedor and administrator of the Mines, judge of orphans in 1599. He died with a will in 1642.
Laras	Spain - Zamora	Dom Diogo de Lara, of the noble Lara family from Spain, he had his nobility attested and proven in Spain and Rio de Janeiro. He was in S. Paulo in the first years of the 1600s. He died with a will in S. Paulo in 1665.
Cunhas Gagos	Portugal	Henrique da Cunha, friend of Admiral Martim Afonso de Souza, he arrived in S. Paulo with the first settlers in 1531. He was accompanied by his wife Fillippa Gago, a close relative of capitão-mor governor Antonio de Oliveira.
Alvarengas	Portugal - Lamego	Antonio Rodrigues of Alvarenga, arrived in the first years of S. Vicente with Martim Afonso de Souza. He received from Martim Afonso the ownership of the office tabelião do judicial e notas of S. Paulo, an administrative position with income rights. He was of noble origin and his descendants had their nobility proven before the Crown of Portugal in 1681, they were permitted to use the coat of arms of their ancestors. Also this title includes the descendants of Manoel Rodrigues de Alvarenga, also from Lamego.
Toledos Pizas	Portugal - Angra do Heroísmo	Dom Simão de Toledo Piza, of Spanish and Portuguese origin, his family was researched by Pedro Taques in the 1700s, according to this research made in the Azores, he was a descendant of the noble family of the Toledos, the same family of the House of Alba in Spain. In his will in 1668, he tells part of his story, including that he was arrested when he was carrying orders from Madrid, he never found out the reason for his arrest. According to him, he arrived in S. Paulo as a fugitive, where his past was not known. Toledo Piza was greatly regarded, and occupied high positions in S. Paulo, including royal appointments. His mother, of Portuguese origin, was the heiress of a Majorat in the Azores.
Godoys	Spain - Castile	Balthazar de Godoy, Castilian nobleman, arrived in S. Paulo during the Iberian Union. He married one of the daughters of capitão-mor governor Jorge Moreira.
Cubas	Portugal - Porto	Braz Cubas, Antonio Cubas, Gonçalo Nunes Cubas and Catharina Cubas. Four siblings that arrived with Martim Afonso de Souza in 1531. They were of noble origin. Braz Cubas, the most illustrious member of this family was a noble knight of the Royal House, capitão-mor governor of S. Vicente, he founded the city of Santos, the first Holy House of Mercy (Hospital) in the Americas and was the leader of expeditions to the interior that founded gold and gems for the first time in Brazil.
Furquins	France - Lorraine	Estevão Furquim, from Lorraine married Suzanna Moreira, another daughter of capitão-mor Jorge Moreira.
Bicudos	Portugal - S. Miguel Island	Antonio Bicudo Carneiro and Vicente Bicudo, two brothers of noble descent from the Island of S. Miguel, Azores. Antonio Bicudo Carneiro was a member of the administration of S. Vicente and occupied the high position of Ouvidor in 1585. He was responsible for the establishment of the municipal council in the city of São Paulo.
Carrascos	Spain - S. Lucas de Cana Verde	Miguel Garcia Carrasco, received land grants and died with a will in 1658. His family played an important role in the history of S. Paulo, especially in the modern state of Paraná, originally part of S. Paulo.
Chassins	Portugal - Portimão	Gonçalo Simões Chassim, from Portimão, Portugal. He became a wealthy land owner and founded the chapel of Our Lady of Nazareth. He died in S. Paulo on the 25 of May 1720. He was buried in the chapel of the Third Order of S. Francis in S. Paulo.
Moraes	Portugal - Tras-os-Montes	Balthazar de Moraes de Antas, noblemen, son of a noble knight of the Royal House, he had his nobility attested both in Portugal and Brazil. A direct descendant of Dom Mendo Alam, Lord of Bragança.
Bayão	Portugal - Beja	Estevão Ribeiro Bayão Parente, from Beja, he married Magdalena Fernandes Feijó de Madureira, from Porto.
Freitas	Portugal - Silves	Sebastião de Freitas, his father was a noblemen from Silves and the Provedor of the Holy House of Mercy of Silves. Arrived in Bahia in 1591, as a soldier in the company of captain Gabriel Soares, with forces under Dom Francisco de Souza. He was involved in the wars against enemy tribes that were surrounding S. Paulo. Also took part in expeditions to the interior. As a reward for his services he was knighted by governor-general Dom Francisco de Souza, with a royal decree. He also received the patent of Captain of the troops of S. Paulo.
Fernandes Povoadores	Portugal - Moura	Manoel Fernandes Ramos, arrived in S. Paulo after 1550. He occupied positions in the administration of S. Paulo and married the part native Suzana Dias, granddaughter of Chief Tibiriçá. The couple founded and built the first chapel of Santana de Parnaiba according to some sources, others claim it was Suzana Dias and their son Andre Fernandes that founded the town. Two other sons also founded important towns, the family owned an immense amount of land. Baltasar Fernandes founded Sorocaba and built a Monastery there. Domingos Fernandes, another son, founded Itu. For this reason they are called Povoadores, which means settlers or founders in Portuguese.
Martins Bonilhas	Spain - Castile	Francisco Martins Bonilha arrived in Santos in the Armada of general Diogo Flores de Bardez, his future brother-in-law. The family had their nobility proven in an inheritance dispute in 1658.
Cordeiros Paivas	Portugal - Espinhel	Domingos Cordeiro, from Espinhel, Diocese of Coimbra. He was married first to Antonia de Paiva, that died in S. Paulo. Married a second time in 1630 to Anna Ribeiro from S. Paulo.
Arzam	Flanders	Cornelio de Arzam, a wealthy pioneer from Flanders. He arrived in Brazil with governor-general Dom Francisco de Souza and was hired by the Portuguese Crown, for a large amount of money, to build the ironworks of S. Paulo (A Real Fábrica de Ferro São João do Ipanema). He became extremely wealthy. He was arrested by the Portuguese Inquisition in 1620 for being of reformed religion (a protestant) and all his private property were confiscated. He later was released and built a considerable estate from scratch again after receiving a land grant. He financed at his own expense the main church of S. Paulo, predecessor of the São Paulo See Metropolitan Cathedral. One of his descendants was the first explorer to find gold in Minas Gerais, starting the Brazilian Gold Rush.
Costas Cabraes	Portugal - S. Miguel Island	Captain Manoel da Costa Cabral, from the Island of S. Miguel, in the Azores. He was of noble origin, a direct descendant of the house of the lords of Belmonte, the same house of the discoverer of Brazil, admiral Pedro Álvares Cabral. He died in Taubaté in 1659.
Garcias Velhos	Portugal - Porto	Garcia Rodrigues and his wife Izabel Velho, from Porto. They arrived in S. Vicente with many sons and daughters (11 siblings). Among them Father Garcia Rodrigues Velho.
Siqueiras Mendonças		Antonio de Siqueira, arrived in Santos where he was the proprietor of the offices of tabelião, escrivão of the Municipal Chamber and Orphans of the Village of Santos. He married Victoria Nunes Pinto, daughter of the early settler of S. Vicente, Francisco Pinto, niece of Ruy Pinto and Antonio Pinto, noble knights of the Royal House.
Dias	Portugal	Pedro Dias, of the Parente Dias Velho family in Portugal. He arrived in S. Vicente in the first years, as a simple lay Jesuit brother. He was one of the founders of the Jesuit Mission in S. Paulo, a co-founder of São Paulo. He received permission from Ignatius de Loyola, head of the Jesuits in Rome to marry Maria da Grã, daughter of Chief Tibiriçá. This marriage was considered important by the Catholic Church to seal an alliance between the Portuguese and Tibiriçá. He married a second time, to Maria Gomes da Silva, of Portuguese and Amerindian origin.
Domingues		Pedro Domingues, of humble origin, he was one of the earliest colonists in S. Vicente, he was married to Clara Fernandes. His son received a large land grant in the south of São Paulo in 1638, this grant would form the future municipality of Santo Amaro, today again part of the city of São Paulo. His descendants occupied important positions in the administration of S. Paulo.
Macieis	Portugal - Viana do Castelo	João Maciel, of noble origin, he was already in S. Paulo in the year 1570. He was married to Paula Camacho. He had 10 children in total, some born in Portugal.
Pretos	Portugal	Antonio Preto, of proven nobility, he provided relevant services in the defense of S. Vicente, against natives and privateers. He arrived in S. Vicente from Portugal with six sons.
Rodrigues Lopes	Portugal	Simão Lopes, from Portugal, he was married to Joanna Fernandes from S. Paulo.
Jorges Velhos	Portugal - Viana do Castelo	Simão Jorge, from Viana do Minho, arrived in S. Vicente with his wife, Agostinha Rodrigues, daughter of Garcia Rodrigues and Izabel Velho, from Porto.
Saavedras	Spain - Castile	Francisco de Saavedra, from Castile, he married in S. Paulo to Maria Moreira, another daughter of Jorge Moreira, that was capitão-mor governor of S. Vicente and his wife, Izabel Velho.
Gayas	Portugal	Manoel Affonso Gaya, Domingos Affonso Gaya and Paschoal Affonso, brothers. They were born in Portugal and arrived in Santos. A fourth brother of unknown name accompanied them. This unknown brother settled in Vitória, Espírito Santo.
Furtados	Portugal - Monsanto de Caminha	Daniel (or Leonel) Furtado, from Monsanto de Caminha, he was the son of Simão Furtado and Catharina Luiz. He was married to Gracia Mendes.
Oliveiras	Portugal	Antonio de Oliveira, a noble knight of the Royal House, he first arrived in S. Vicente in 1537 as Factor of King Dom João III in S. Vicente. He served multiple times as capitão-mor governor of S. Vicente. He returned to Portugal in 1542 to get his wife and children after serving for a few years. His wife was Genebra Leitão de Vasconcellos.
Vaz Guedes	Portugal - Mesão Frio	Antonio Vaz Guedes and his wife, Margarida Correa, first arrived in the Captaincy of Espírito Santo. His sons and daughter married into families from S. Paulo.
Rendons	Spain - Coria	Dom João Matheus Rendon de Quebedo, Dom Francisco Rendon de Quebedo, Dom José Rendon de Quebedo and Dom Pedro Matheus Rendon Cabeça de Vaca. Four brothers that arrived first in Bahia in the armada of Dom Fadrique de Toledo, 1st Marquis of Villanueva de Valdueza. They were the sons of Spanish nobleman Dom Pedro Matheus Rendon and Magdalena Clemente de Alarcão Cabeça de Vaca. After the liberation of Salvador in the Dutch–Portuguese War they settled in S. Paulo.
Arias, Aguirres and Sodrés	Portugal - Lisbon	Diogo Arias de Aguirre, his parents were João Martins de Aguirre, from New Spain and Izabel de Araujo Barros from Lisbon. João Martins de Aguirre was a noble of the Royal House of Portugal. Diogo Arias de Aguirre was sent to S. Paulo as capitão-mor governor in 1598. In Santos he married Marianna Leitão de Vasconcellos, daughter of the past capitão-mor governor Antonio de Oliveira.
Dultras Machados	Portugal - S. Miguel Island	Manoel Dultra Machado, from the Island of S. Miguel. He died in S. Paulo in 1711. He was married to Maria da Silva.
Pires de Ávila	Angola	Manoel de Ávila, from Portuguese Angola, he was the son of Braz Lopes Alcanforado, from Elvas, and Maria Alves, from Lisbon. He died in S. Paulo with a will in 1731. He was married to Anna Ribeiro from S. Paulo.
Dias Chaves	Portugal - Vimeiro	Domingos Dias from Lourinhã, Vimeiro. Of noble origin he was married to Marianna de Chaves. The couple settled in S. Vicente in the early years.
Moniz de Gusmão	Portugal - Algarve	Pedro de Sousa Moniz, a descendant of Garcia de Gusmão Moniz, noble knight of the Royal House. This family carried the arms of the Moniz and Gusmão families. He married Catharina Vieira.

== Descendants ==
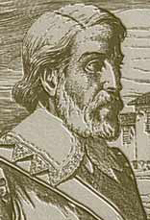
Amador Bueno (c. 1584 - c. 1649)

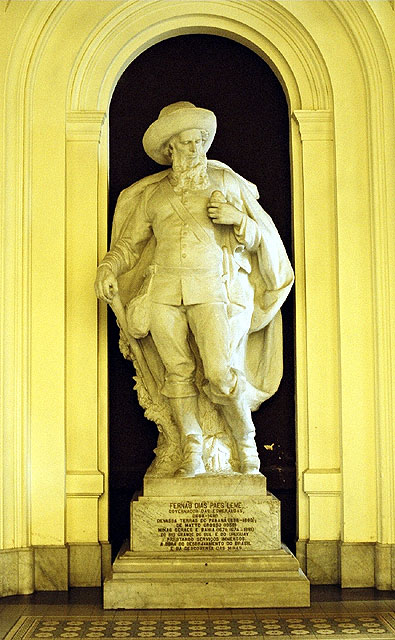
Fernão Dias Pais (1608–1681)

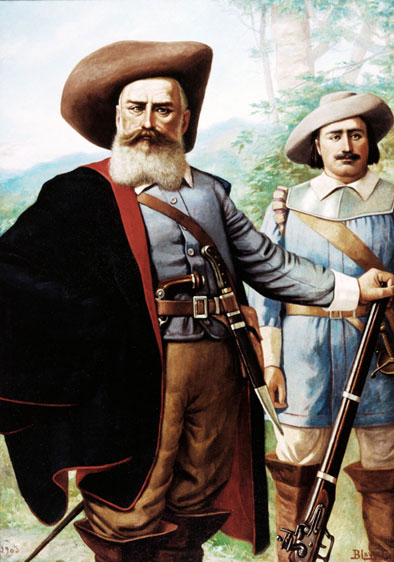
Domingos Jorge Velho (1641–1705)

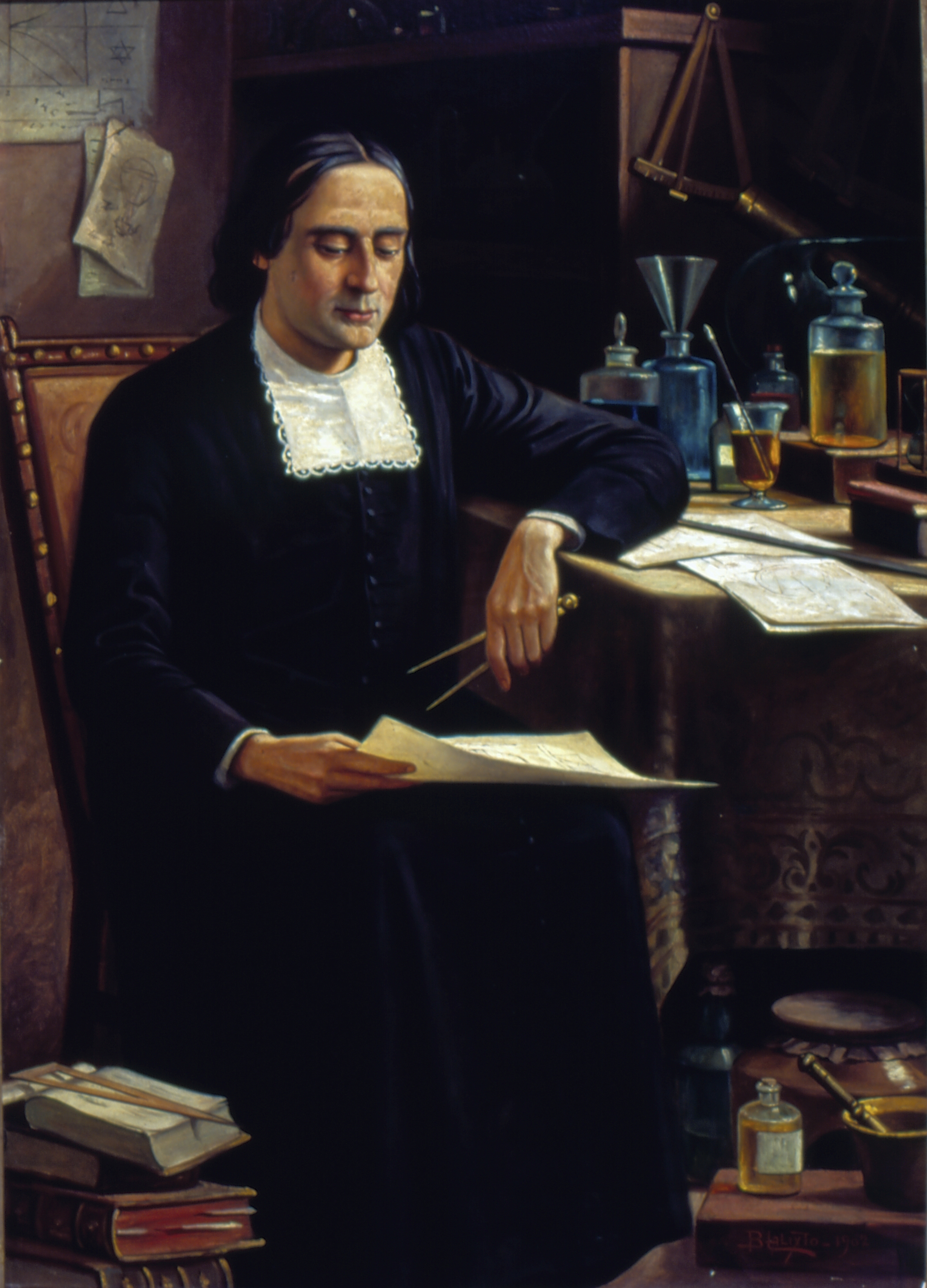
Bartolomeu de Gusmão (1685–1724)

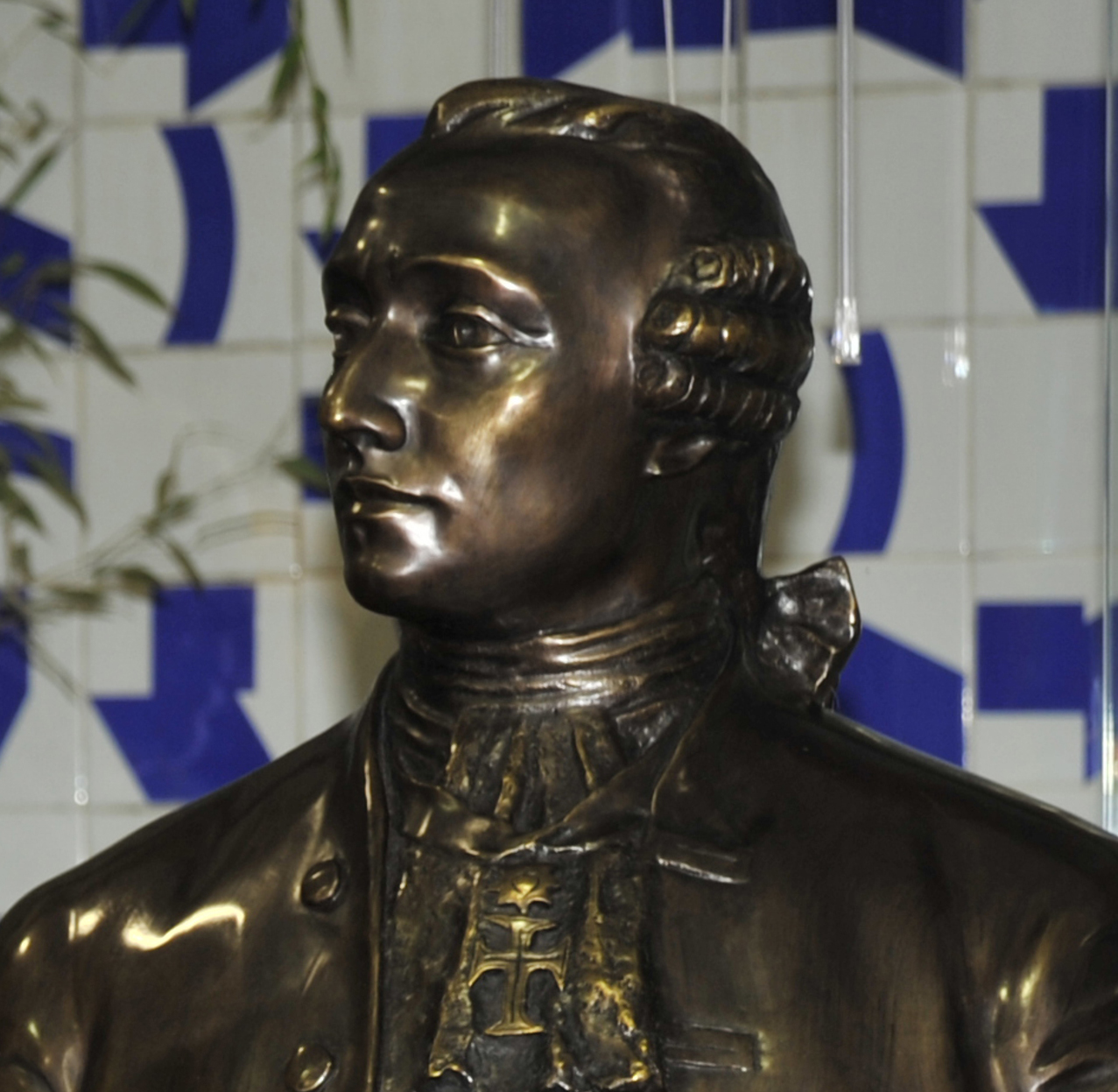
Alexandre de Gusmão (1695–1753)

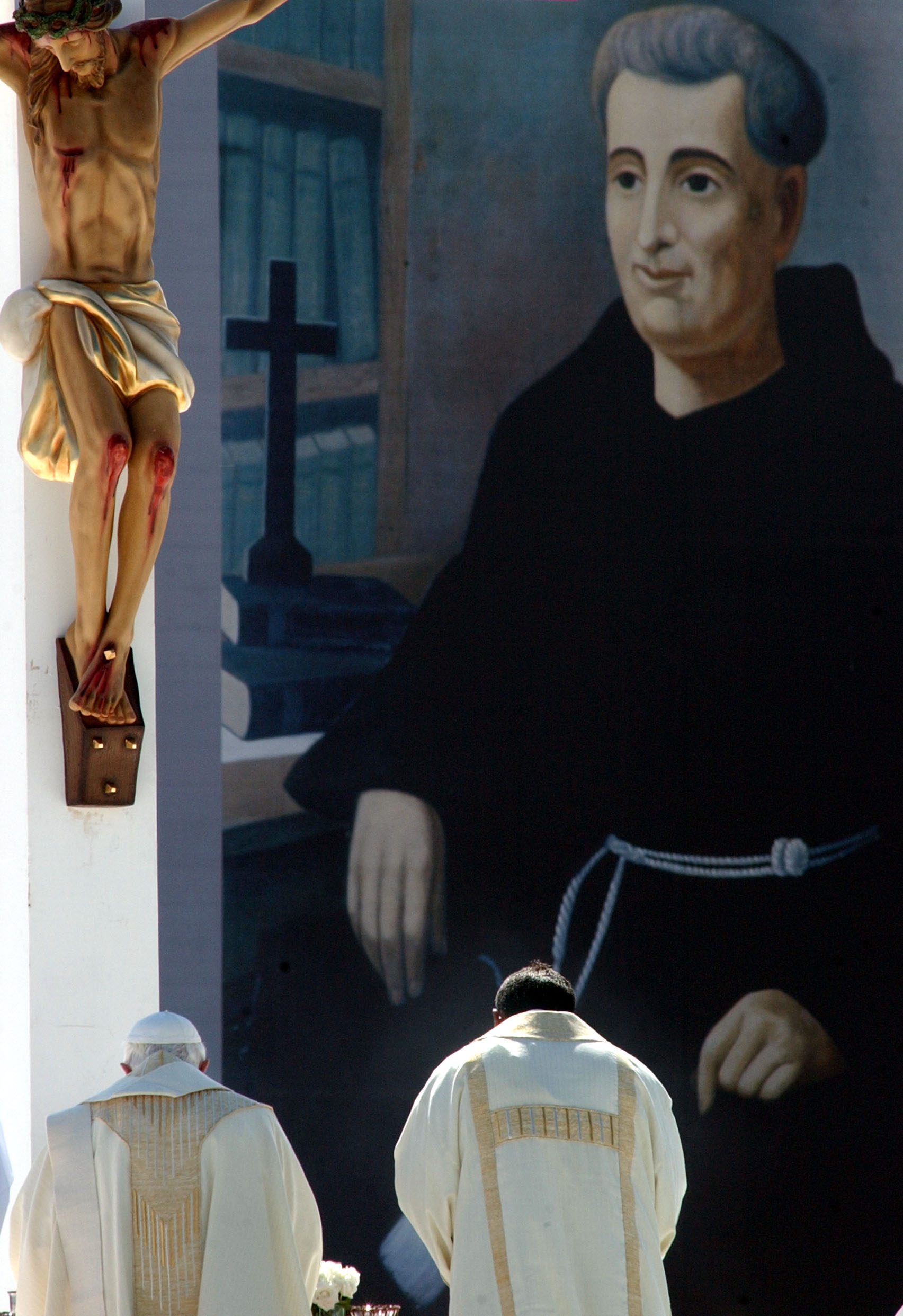
St. Anthony of St. Ann Galvão (1739–1822)

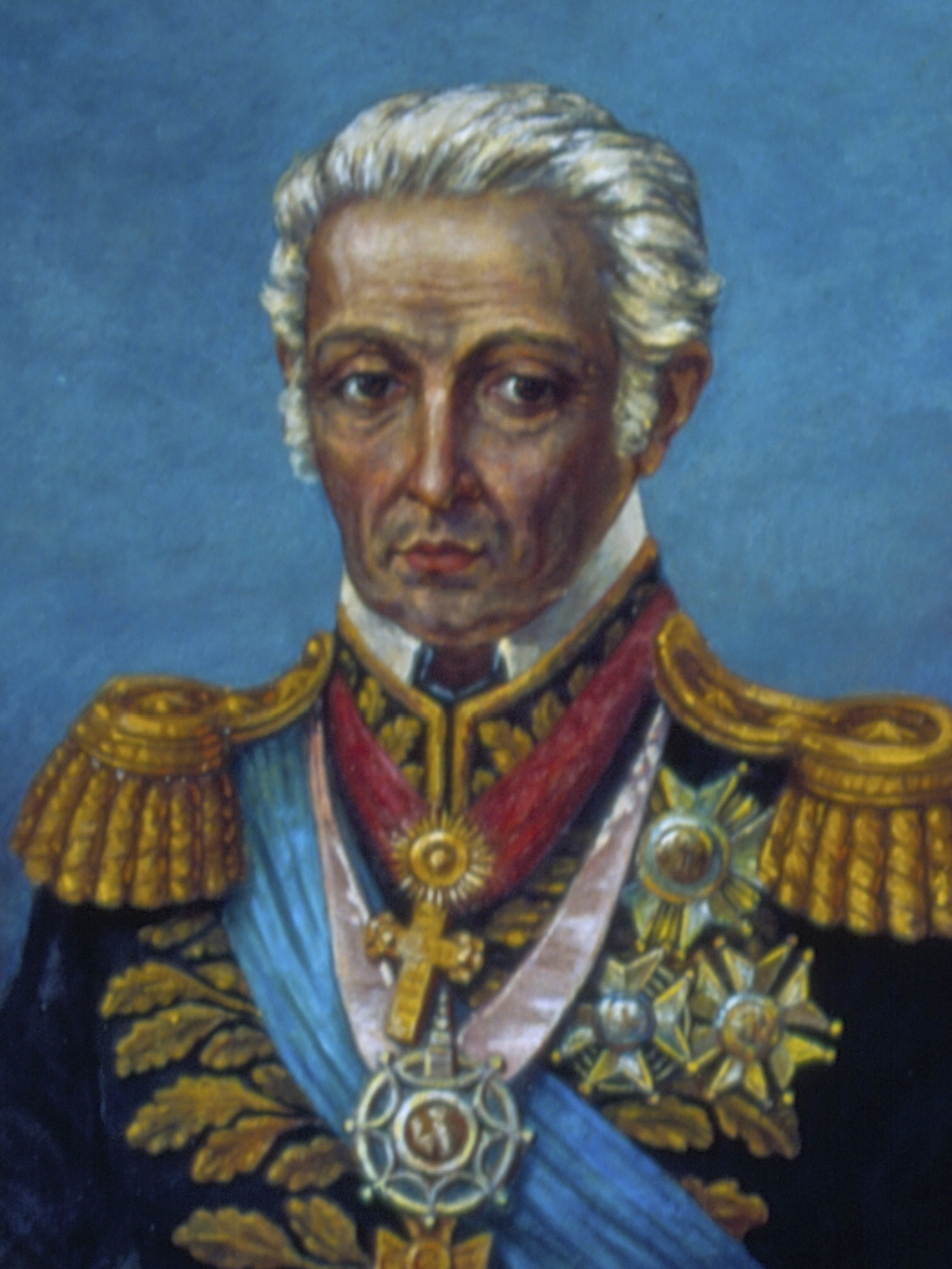
Joaquim Xavier Curado, Count of São João das Duas Barras (1746-1830)

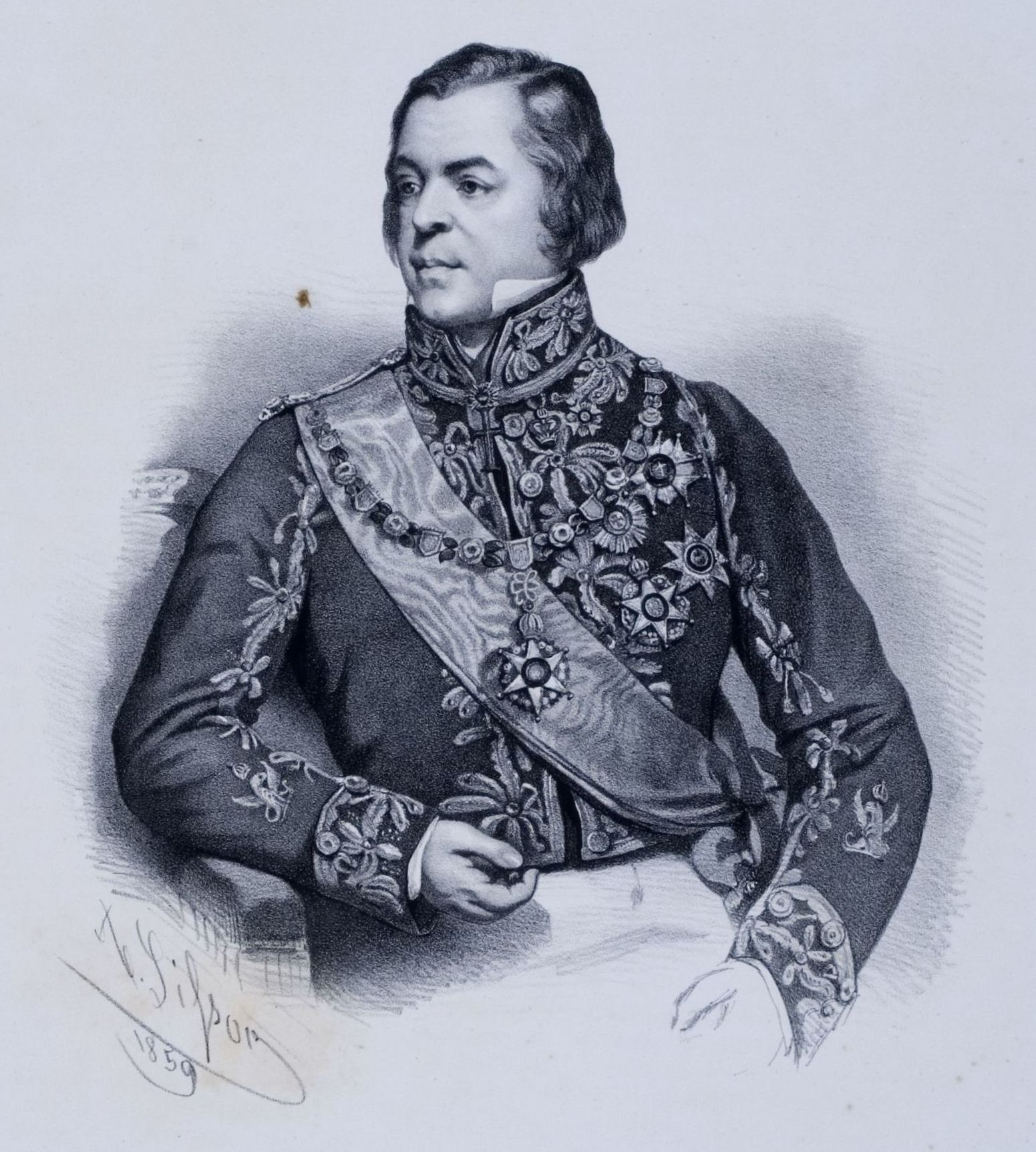
Marquis of Barbacena (1772-1842)

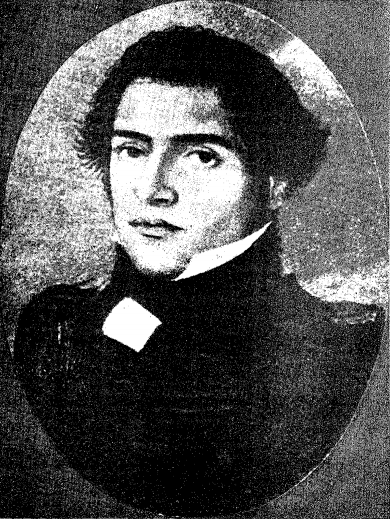
Baron of Tietê (1793-1877)

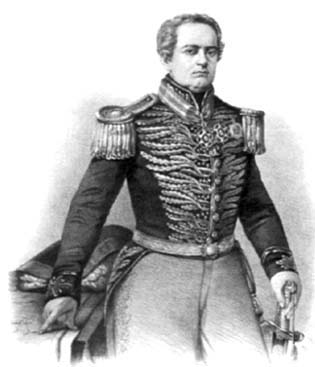
Rafael Tobias de Aguiar (1794-1857)

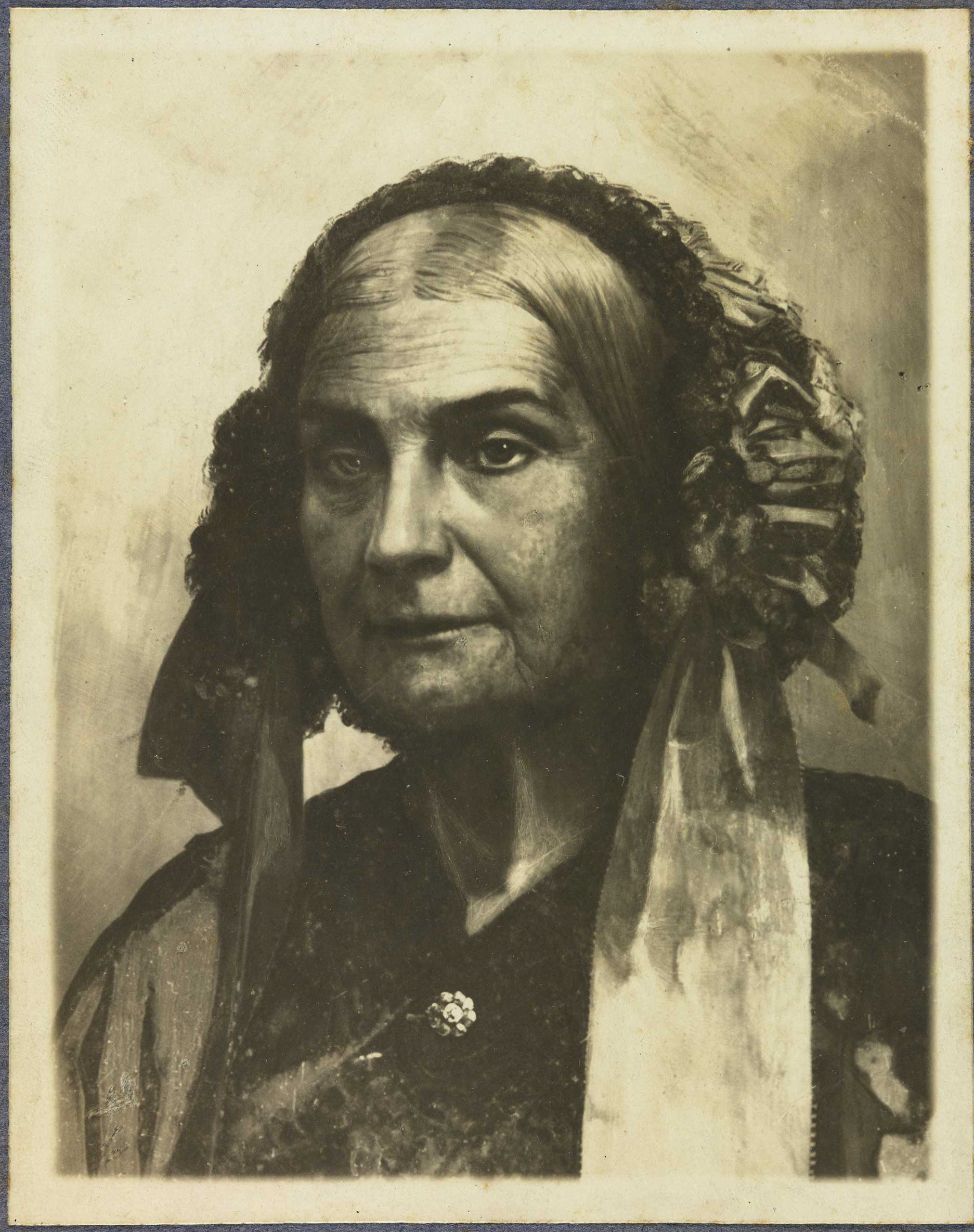
Marchioness of Santos (1797-1867)

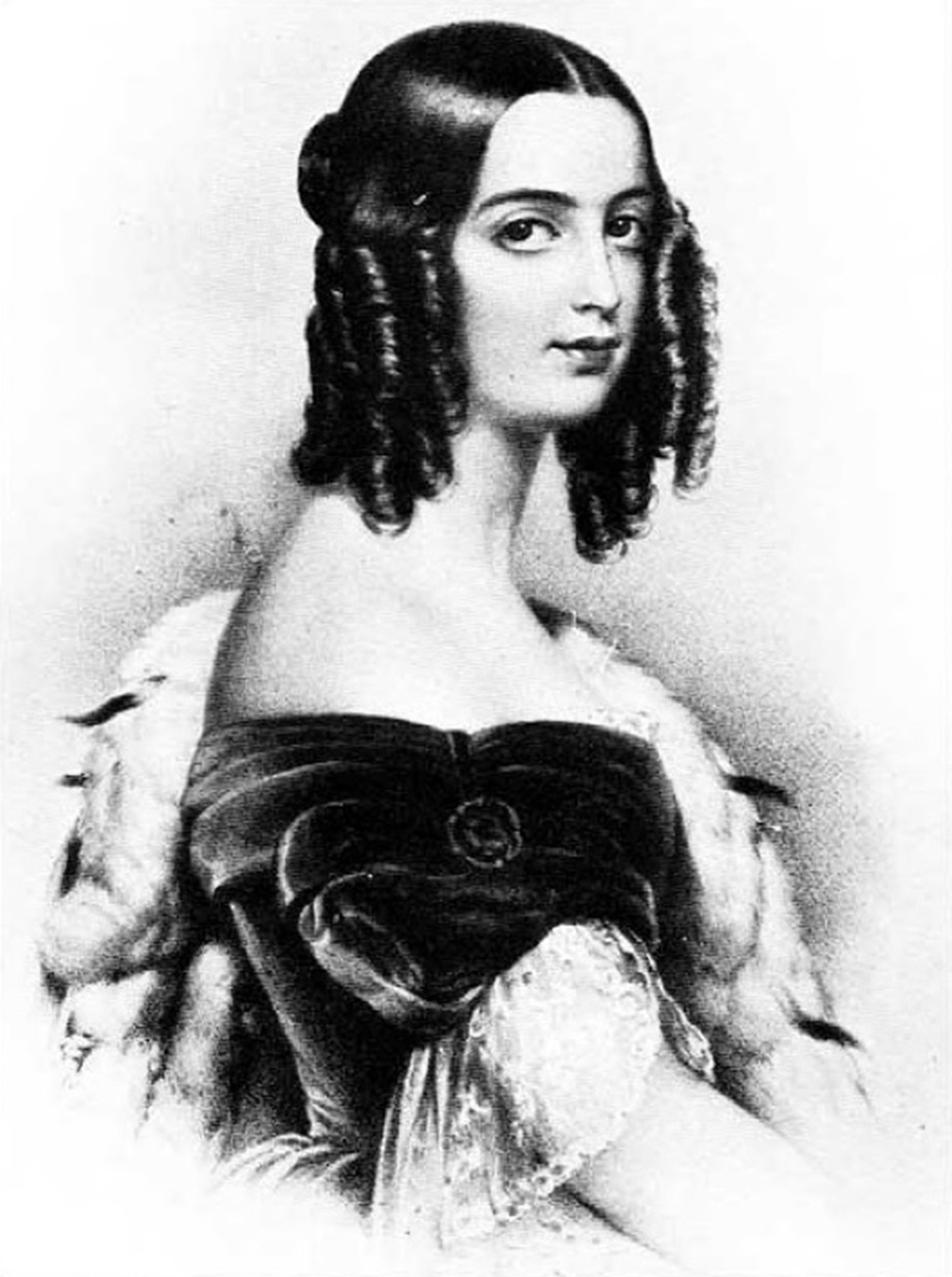
Duchess of Goiás (1824-1898)

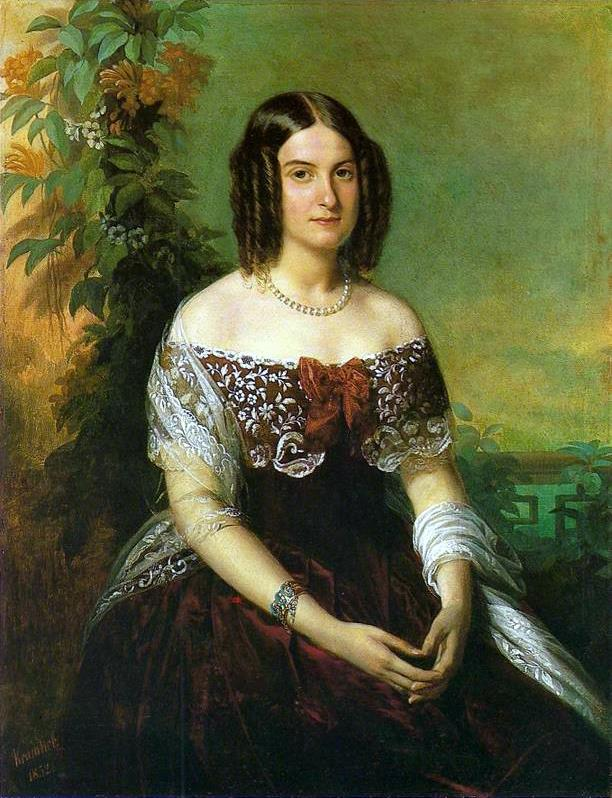
Countess of Iguaçu (1830-1896)

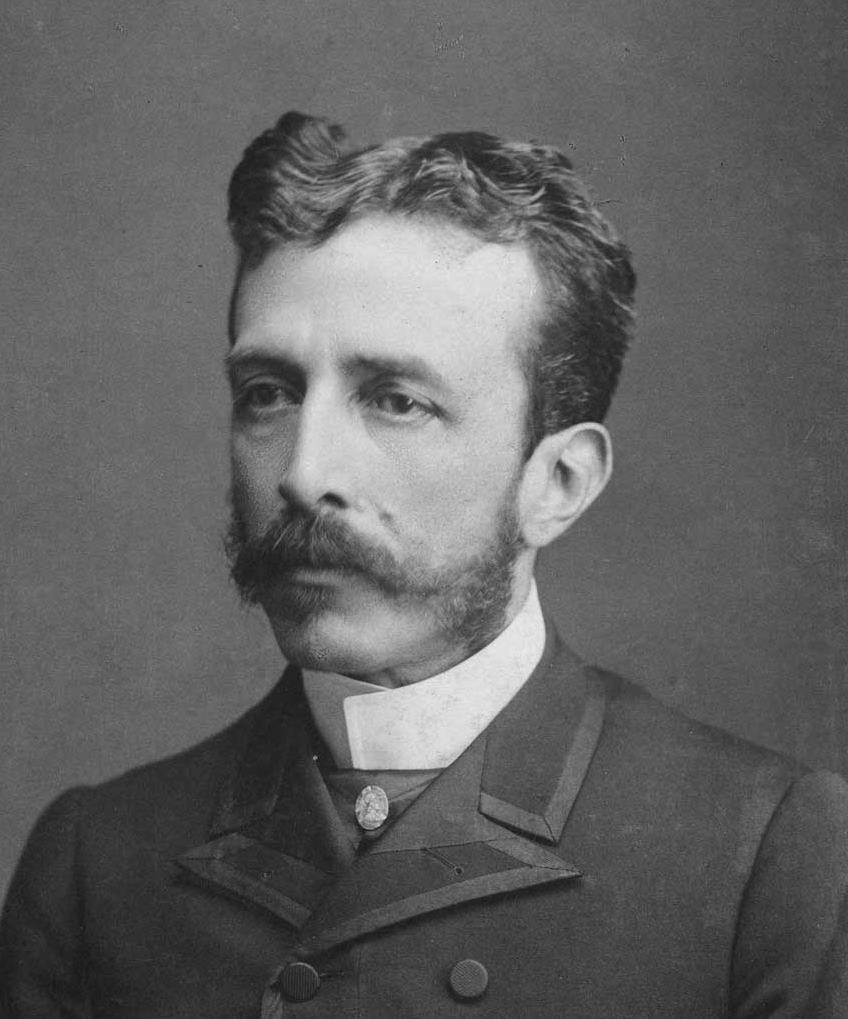
Rodrigo Augusto da Silva (1833-1889)

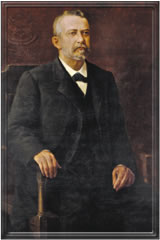
José Alves de Cerqueira César (1835-1911)

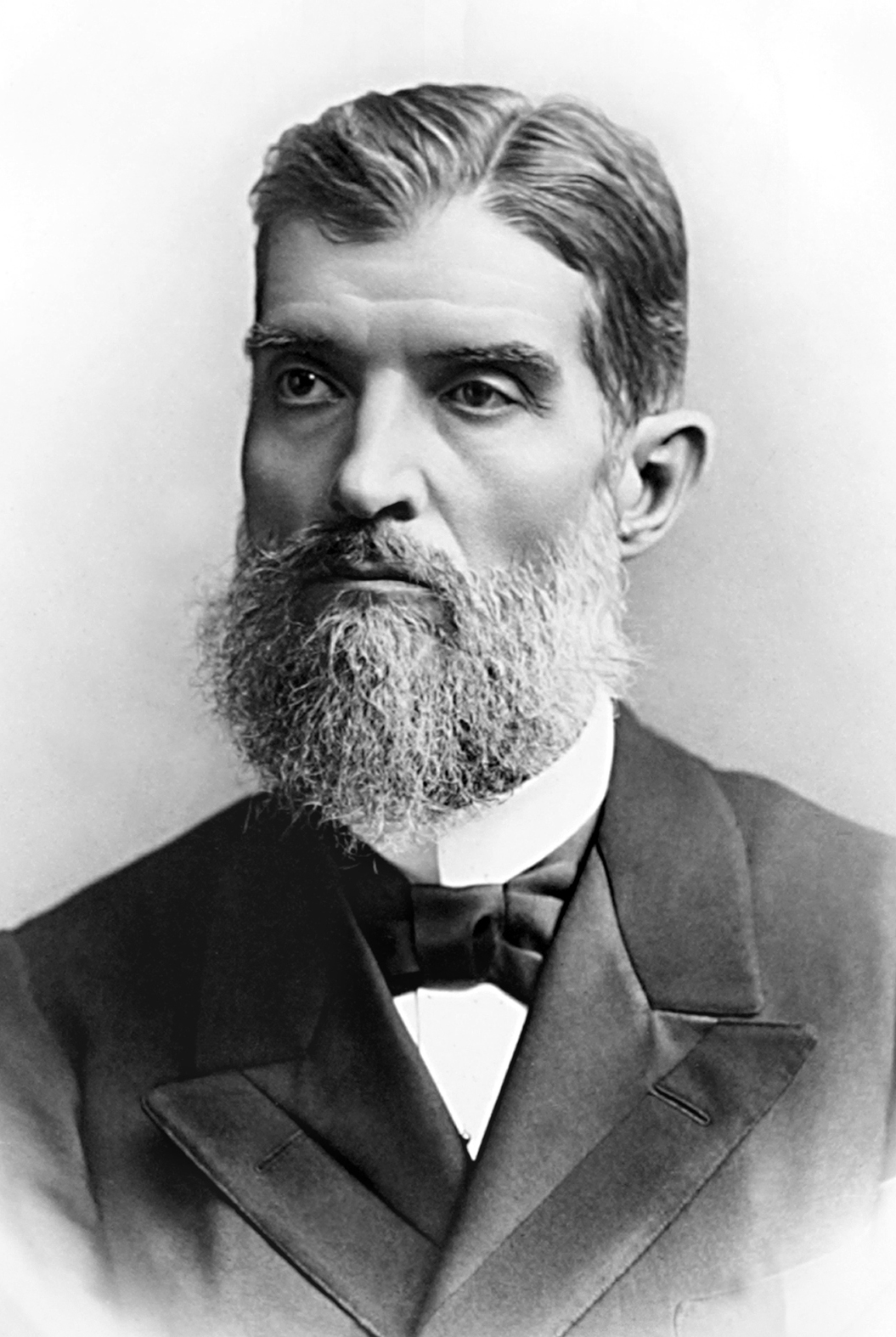
Prudente de Morais (1841-1902)

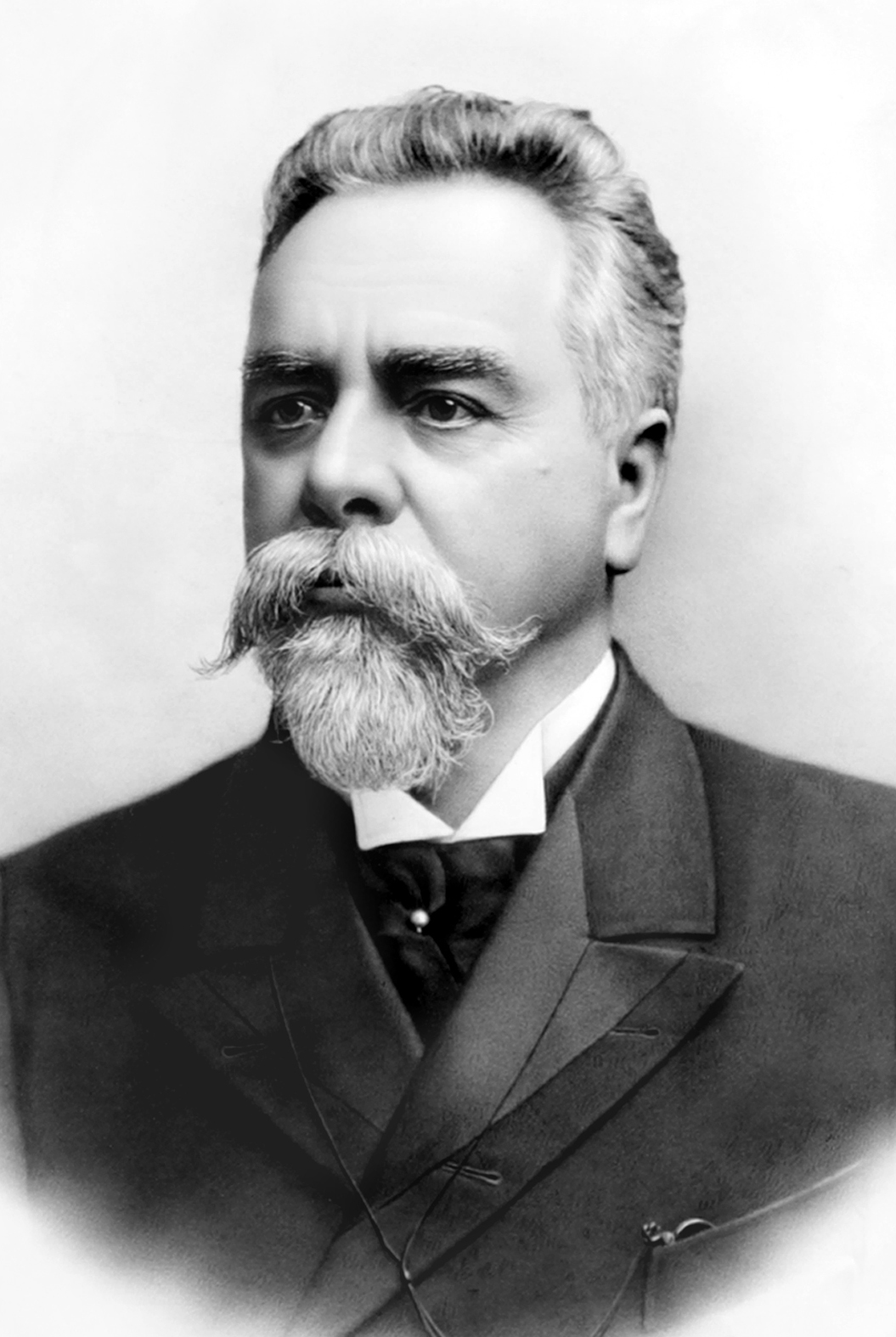
Manuel Ferraz de Campos Sales (1841-1913)

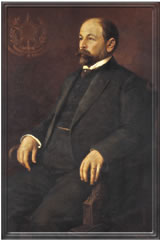
Jorge Tibiriçá Piratininga (1855-1928)

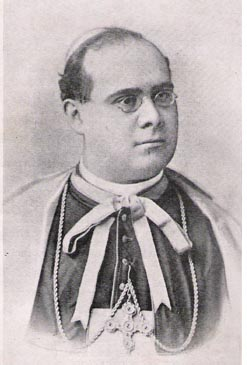
Cardinal Leme (1882-1942)

== See also ==
- Brazilian nobility
- Portuguese nobility
- Spanish nobility
- Fidalgo
- Fazenda
- Coronelism
- Café com leite politics
- Caramuru
- Casa grande (sugar plantation)
- Slavery in Brazil

=== Similar elites in the Americas ===
- First Families of Virginia
- Encomenderos
- Boston Brahmin
- Family Compact of Upper Canada
- Canadian peers and baronets
- Seigneurial system of New France
- Mexican Nobility
- Ranchos of California
- Cuban nobility
- Criollo
