= António Cândido =

António Cândido, or in Brazilian Portuguese Antônio Cândido is a double-barreled masculine first name.

- Antonio Candido (literary critic), penname of Antônio Cândido de Mello e Souza, Brazilian literary critic
- António Cândido Gonçalves Crespo, Brazilian-born Portuguese poet
- António Cândido Ribeiro da Costa (1850 – 1922), Portuguese politician.
