= Baltasar Fernandes =

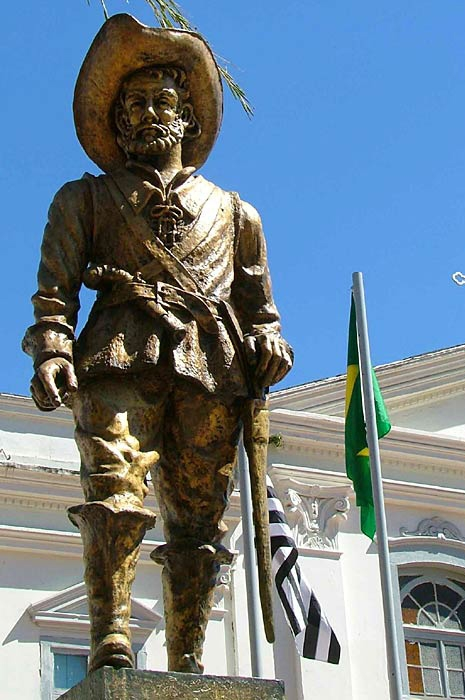
- Statue of Baltasar in Sorocaba
- Born: Baltasar Fernandes c. 1580; Ibirapuera, São Paulo, Portuguese colony of Brazil
- Died: c. 1667 (aged 86-87); Sorocaba, São Paulo, Portuguese colony of Brazil
- Known for: Founder of Sorocaba

Captain Baltasar Fernandes (also spelled Baltazar or Balthazar) (c. 1580 - c. 1667) was a colonist of Captaincy of São Vicente who led the expeditions called Bandeiras into the interior seeking gold, silver, and iron. He was the founder and one of the first settlers of Sorocaba in 1654.

== Early life ==
Fernandes was born in São Paulo and raised in Santana do Parnaíba. His mother, Susana Dias, would establish the farm that would become the city of Santana de Parnaíba. He was the brother of the founder of Itu, Domingos Fernandes, and founder of Santana de Parnaíba, André Fernandes. He married Maria de Zunega of Paraguay, daughter of Bartolomeu de Torales with whom he had a daughter, Mary Torales. After being widowed, married Isabel de Proenca, daughter of João de Abreu who had twelve sons.

He began as a bandeirante (or pioneer) who would enslave natives in Rio Grande do Sul and Paraguay to forcefully work in the fields.

== Founding of Sorocaba ==
Baltasar Fernandes and his son, Captain Andrew of Zunéga Y Leon, along with his family and hundreds of captive native slaves, founded the city of Sorocaba on 15 August 1654.

Around 1654, Fernandes built a house on the edge of the Sorocaba River and a chapel—Nossa Senhora da Ponte—known today as Sorocaba Metropolitan Cathedral. On 21 April 1660 he donated land, plantations and indigenous slaves to the Benedictines. This later became the foundation of the Monastery of St. Benedict (Mosteiro de São Bento).

In 1661, Baltazar Fernandes went to São Paulo to talk to the governor general Salvador Corrêa de Sá e Benevides. Fernandes wanted Sorocaba to cease being a village and turned into a vila (the name given to cities at the time). The governor granted his request and, on 3 March 1661, Sorocaba was elevated to the category of Vila (or town). The full name became the Vila de Nossa Senhora da Ponte de Sorocaba. Sorocaba immediately started a city council and that same day, they named the main members of the board: Judges Baltazar Fernandes and André de Zunega, Aldermans Cláudio Furquim and Paschoal Leite Paes, and Attorney Domingos Garcia, accompanied by Registrar Francisco Sanches.

The seemingly positive attitude Baltasar Fernandes had in relation to the Catholic Church was because he had to mask his Jewish origin. According to the historian Anita Novinsky, Fernandes, as well as many other pioneers, was Jewish and a "New Christian" (cristão-novo). According to one account, Fernandes shot Father Diogo de Alfaro in the head after the Portuguese Inquisition sent him to investigate the Paulista "heretics".

== See also ==
- Sorocaba
- Sorocaba Metropolitan Cathedral
- History of the Jews in Brazil
