= Domingos Fernandes =

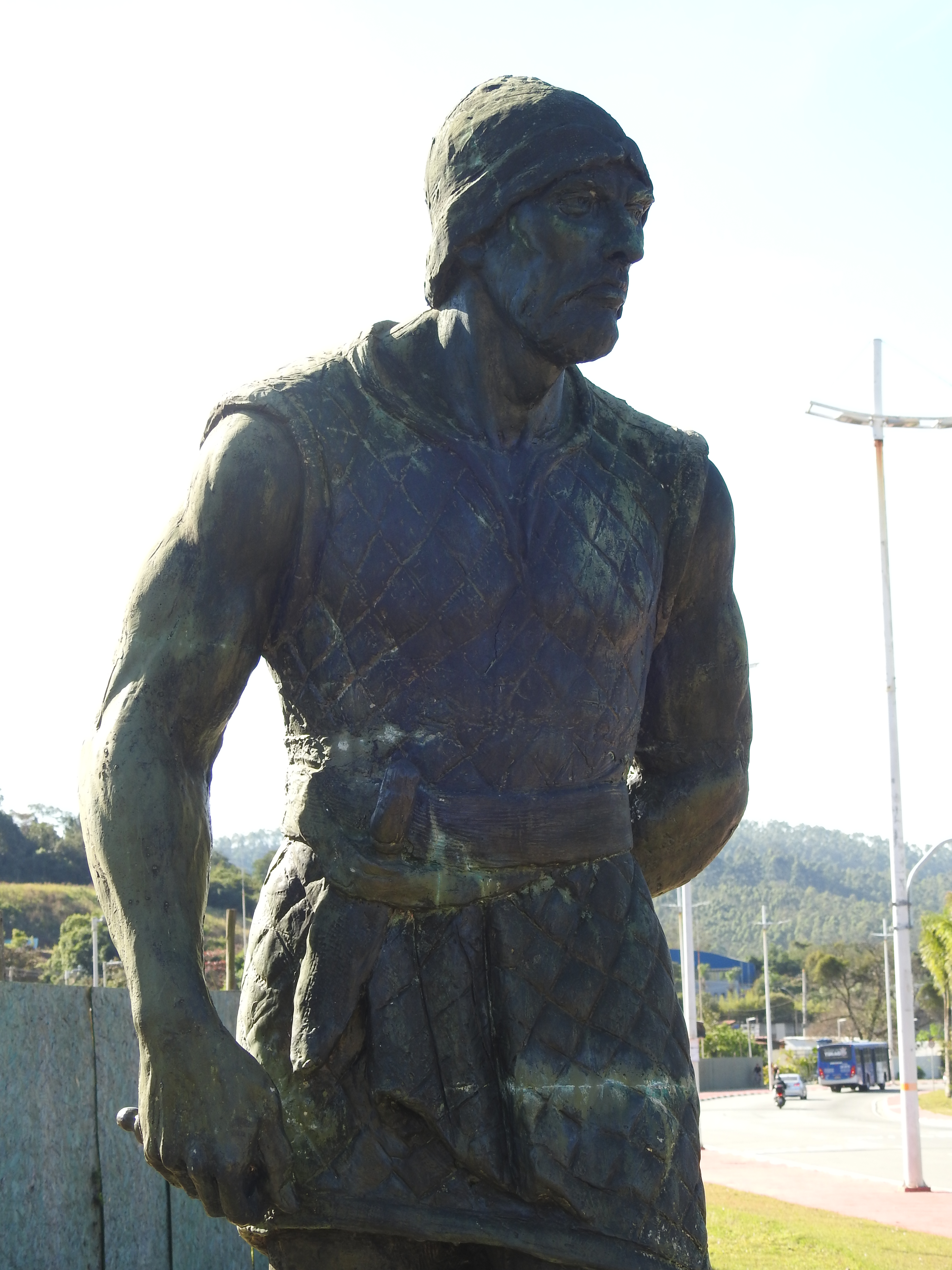
- Statue of Domingos Fernandes in Santana de Parnaíba
- Born: Domingos Fernandes; 1577; São Paulo dos Campos de Piratininga, Colonial Brazil, Kingdom of Portugal (present-day São Paulo, Brazil)
- Died: January 24, 1652; São Paulo dos Campos de Piratininga, Colonial Brazil, Kingdom of Portugal
- Children: 6
- Parent(s): Manoel Fernandes (father); Susana Dias (mother)

Domingos Fernandes (1577 – 24 January 1652) was a Paulista bandeirante in what is now the state of São Paulo. He, along with his father-in-law Cristóvão Diniz, founded what became the city of Itu. He established the village in the name of Our Lady of Candelaria, a veneration of the Virgin Mary, who later became the patron saint of the current city.

== Biography ==
Domingos was the son of Manoel Fernandes and Susana Dias, who founded the village of Parnahyba, what would become the current-day city of Santana de Parnaíba. In 1602, with his brother André Fernandes, he participated in a bandeira group that he co-led with Nicolau Barreto to the region of Guayrá, in modern-day Paraná in search of minerals and Indigenous slaves. These missions would later go on to actively track down and destroy Jesuit missionaries in the region, where the native Guaraní had also fled to in order to avoid enslavement.

At some point between 1610 and 1636, he established the village of Utuguaçu, which would become the city of Itu in the Piratininga region with the Indigenous inhabitants of the region. He erected a chapel in the village, invoking Our Lady of Candelaria of Itu (where the Igreja de Bom Jesus stands today). The village was elevated to the status of parish and later became the city of Itu. Having returned to Parnahyba in 1628, he was an evaluator for the city.
