= Diocese of Joaçaba =

Catholic ecclesiastical territory

Coordinates: 27.1758°S 51.5045°W

Diocese of Joaçaba Dioecesis Ioassabensis Diocese de Joaçaba
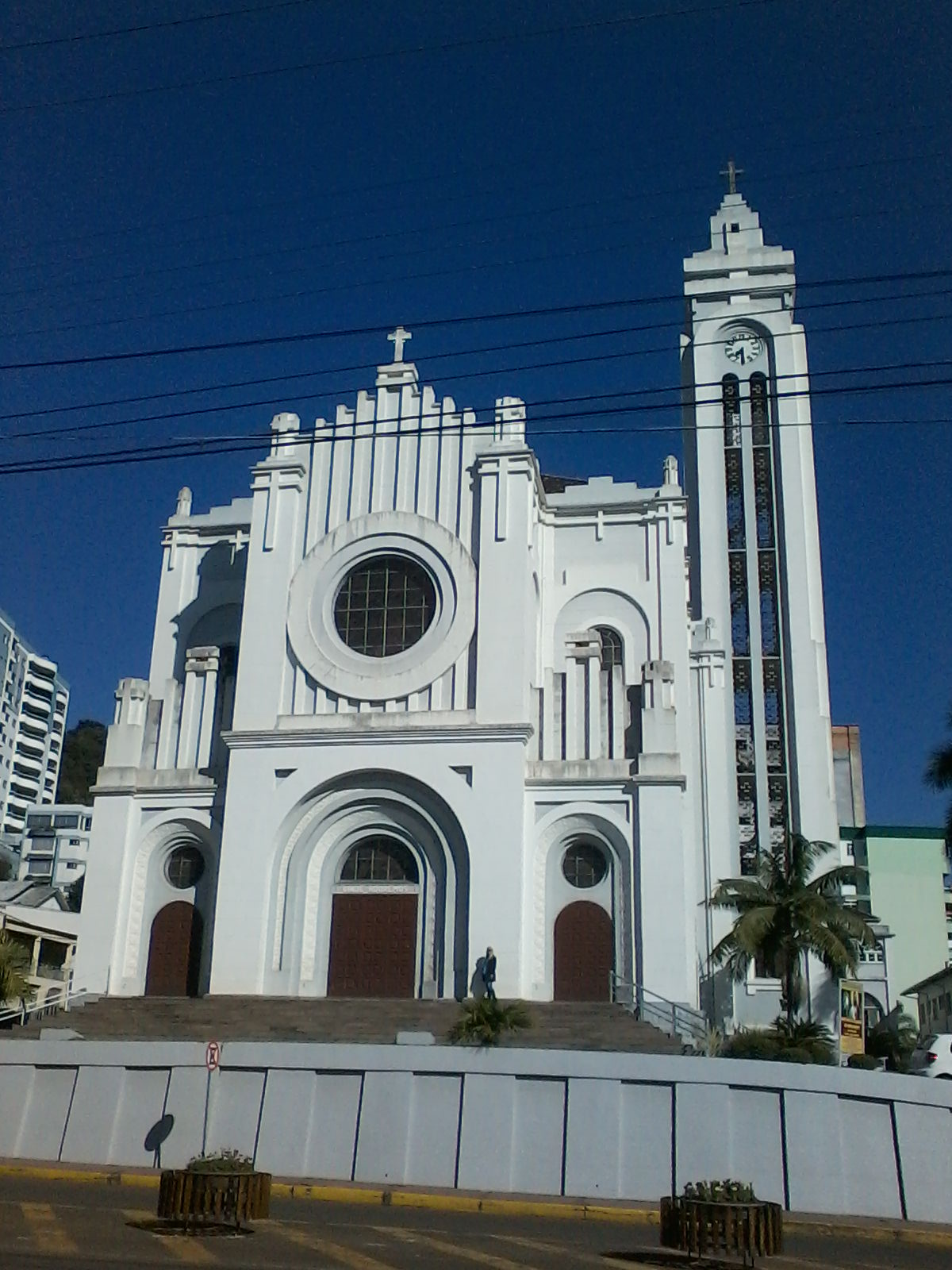
- Cathedral of St. Therese of the Child Jesus in 2014

Location
- Country: Brazil
- Ecclesiastical province: Chapecó
- Metropolitan: Chapecó

Statistics
- Area: 10,202 km^{2} (3,939 sq mi)
- Population: Total; Catholics: (as of 2006); 310,000; 225,000 (72.6%)

Information
- Rite: Latin Rite
- Established: 12 June 1975; 50 years ago
- Cathedral: Cathedral of St. Therese of the Child Jesus

Current leadership
- Pope: Leo XIV
- Bishop: Mário Marquez
- Metropolitan Archbishop: Odelir José Magri, MCCI
- Bishops emeritus: Osório Bebber

The Roman Catholic Diocese of Joaçaba (Latin: Dioecesis Ioassabensis) is located in the ecclesiastical province of Chapecó, in Santa Catarina state, Brazil. The seat of the diocese is the Cathedral of St. Therese of the Child of Jesus, Joaçaba. It is bordered by the Catarinense dioceses of Chapecó, Caçador and Lages, as well as the dioceses of Erexim and Vacaria on the south and the diocese of Palmas–Francisco Beltrão on the north.

== History ==
- 12 June 1975: Established from the dioceses of Caçador, Chapecó and Lages.

== Bishops ==
- Bishops of Joaçaba (Roman rite)
  - Mario Marquez, OFMCap (2010.12.22 – present); formerly Auxiliary bishop of the Diocese of Vitoria, Brazil
  - Walmir Alberto Valle, IMC (2003.04.09 – 2010.04.14)
  - Osório Bebber, OFMCap (1999.03.17 – 2003.04.09)
  - Henrique Müller, OFM (1975.06.27 – 1999.03.17)

=== Coadjutor bishop ===
- Walmir Alberto Valle, IMC (2002-2003)
