= José Moreira de Melo =

Brazilian Roman Catholic prelate (1941–2025)

His Excellency José Moreira de Melo
- Bishop Emeritus of Itapeva
- Province: Sorocaba
- Diocese: Itapeva
- Appointed: 17 January 1996
- Term ended: 19 October 2016
- Predecessor: Alano Maria Pena
- Successor: Arnaldo Carvalheiro Neto

Orders
- Ordination: 27 January 1968
- Consecration: 25 March 1996 by João Bosco Oliver de Faria, Benedito de Ulhôa Vieira and José Lambert Filho

Personal details
- Born: 3 August 1941 Serra do Salitre, Minas Gerais, Brazil
- Died: 25 October 2025 (aged 84) Itapeva, São Paulo, Brazil
- Motto: Sodalitas ad Evangelizandum

José Moreira de Melo (3 August 1941 – 25 October 2025) was a Brazilian Roman Catholic prelate who served as bishop of Itapeva from 1996 to 2016.

== Biography ==
José Moreira de Melo was born in Serra do Salitre on 3 August 1941. He entered the seminary in 1954 and his ordination as a priest took place on 27 January 1968, in Patos de Minas.

He received episcopal appointment on 17 January 1996 and was ordained bishop in Patos de Minas, on 25 March 1996, with Archbishop João Bosco Oliver de Faria as main ordainer: Archbishop João Bosco Oliver de Faria and concelebrants: Archbishop Benedito de Ulhôa Vieira and Dom José Lambert Filho C.S.S.

By virtue of his 75 years, of which 20 he exercised in the episcopal ministry of Itapeva, he presented Pope Francis with his resignation as provided for in the Code of Canon Law, then becoming bishop emeritus of that diocese.

De Melo died on 25 October 2025, at the age of 84.

Catholic Church titles
Preceded by Alano Maria Pena	Bishop of Itapeva; 1996–2016	Succeeded by Arnaldo Carvalheiro Neto
