= Rede Xistv =

REDE XISTV
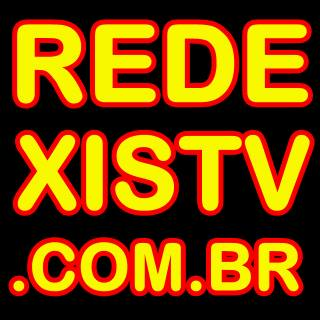
- Country: Brazil
- Broadcast area: Brazil
- Headquarters: Santana de Parnaiba (SP)

Programming
- Picture format: 1080i (HDTV)

Ownership
- Owner: Clitai Corp Brazil

History
- Launched: August 14th, 2005

Links
- Website: www.redexistv.com.br

Rede Xistv is a Brazilian TV station, with headquarters in Santana de Parnaiba, a city in the state of São Paulo.

== History ==
The station was founded in 2005 accordingly with Lei do Cabo and currently broadcasts Rede Xistv's own productions through more than 60 channels, always in HD.

Rede Xistv has had its trademark protected since 2004 by INPI.

The first programs were televised sports and local news. Now the focus is on the regional identity of the network, with coverage of local and regional events and news.
