= Diocese of Lages =

Catholic ecclesiastical territory

Coordinates: 27.8169°S 50.3258°W

Diocese of Lages Dioecesis Lagensis Diocese de Lages
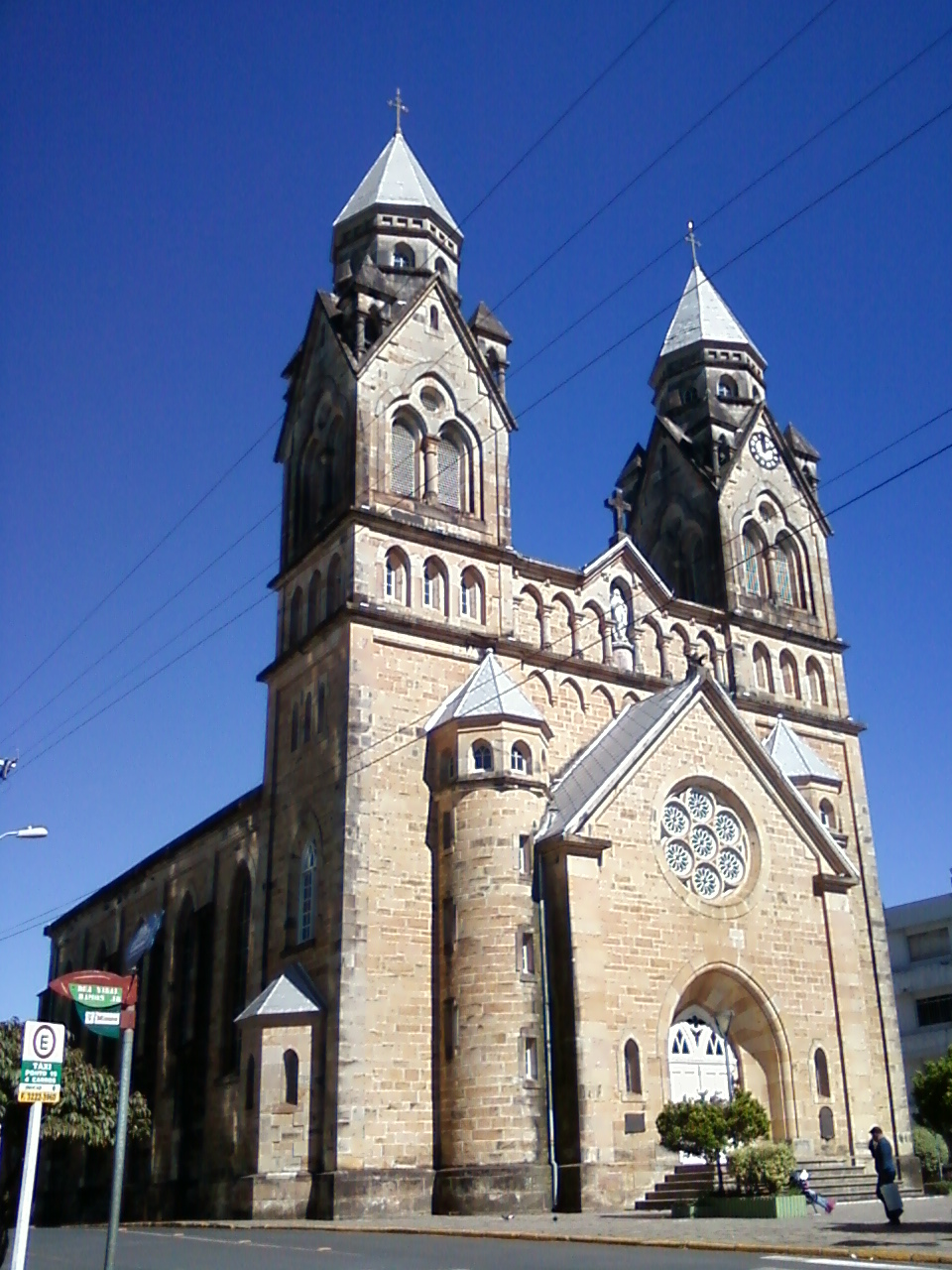
- Cathedral of Our Lady of Joy

Location
- Country: Brazil
- Ecclesiastical province: Chapecó
- Metropolitan: Chapecó
- Headquarters: Lages, Santa Catarina, Brazil

Statistics
- Area: 18,207 km^{2} (7,030 sq mi)
- Population: Total; Catholics: (as of 2023); 410,000; 351,000 (85.6%)
- Parishes: 26

Information
- Denomination: Catholic Church
- Sui iuris church: Latin Church
- Rite: Roman Rite
- Established: 17 January 1927; 99 years ago
- Cathedral: Cathedral of Our Lady of Joy in Lages
- Patron saint: Our Lady of Joy

Current leadership
- Pope: Leo XIV
- Bishop: Gilson Meurer
- Metropolitan Archbishop: Odelir José Magri, M.C.C.I.
- Bishops emeritus: Guilherme Antônio Werlang, M.S.F.

The Roman Catholic Diocese of Lages (Latin: Dioecesis Lagensis) is a Latin Rite suffragan diocese in the ecclesiastical province of Chapecó in Santa Catarina state, Brazil.

Its cathedral episcopal see is Catedral Nossa Senhora dos Prazeres, dedicated to Our Lady of Joy, in the city of Lages.

== Statistics ==
As of 2023, it pastorally served 351,000 Catholics (85.6% of 410,000 total population) in the area of 18,207 km², in 26 parishes with 35 priests (all diocesan), 10 deacons and 8 lay religious (all sisters).

== History ==
- 17 January 1927: Established as Diocese of Lages, on territory split off from the then Diocese of Santa Caterina (now its Metropolitan Florianopolis)
- It lost territory repeatedly : on 9 December 1933 to establish the Territorial Prelature of Palmas (now Diocese of Palmas-Francisco Beltrão), on 14 January 1958 to establish the Diocese of Chapecó, on 23 November 1968 to establish the Diocese of Caçador and on 12 June 1975 to establish the Diocese of Joaçaba.

== Leadership ==
(all Roman rite)

=== Bishops of Lages ===
- Daniel Henrique Hostin, O.F.M. (2 August 1929 – 17 November 1973)
- Honorato Piazera, S.C.I. (17 November 1973 – 18 February 1987), retired
- João Oneres Marchiori (18 February 1987 – 11 November 2009), retired
- Irineu Andreassa, O.F.M. (11 November 2009 – 30 November 2016), appointed Bishop of Ituiutaba, Minas Gerais
  - Apostolic Administrator José Nelson Westrupp, S.C.I. (4 February 2017 – 17 March 2018), Bishop Emeritus of Santo André, São Paulo
- Guilherme Antônio Werlang, M.S.F. (7 February 2018 – 5 November 2025), retired
- Gilson Meurer (5 November 2025 – Present)

=== Coadjutor bishops ===
- Afonso Niehues (1959-1965), appointed Coadjutor Archbishop of Florianópolis, Santa Catarina
- Honorato Piazera, S.C.I. (1966-1973), succeeded
- João Oneres Marchiori (1983-1987), succeeded

=== Auxiliary bishop ===
- Carlos Schmitt, O.F.M. (1970-1973), resigned

=== Another priest of this diocese who became bishop ===
- Orlando Brandes (1974-1994), appointed Bishop of Joinville, Santa Catarina in 1994

== See also ==
- List of Catholic dioceses in Brazil

== Sources and external links ==
- GCatholic.org, with Google satellite map & HQ photo - data for all sections
- diocesan website
- Catholic Hierarchy
