= Diocese of Registro =

Catholic ecclesiastical territory

Diocese of Registro Dioecesis Registrensis

Catholic
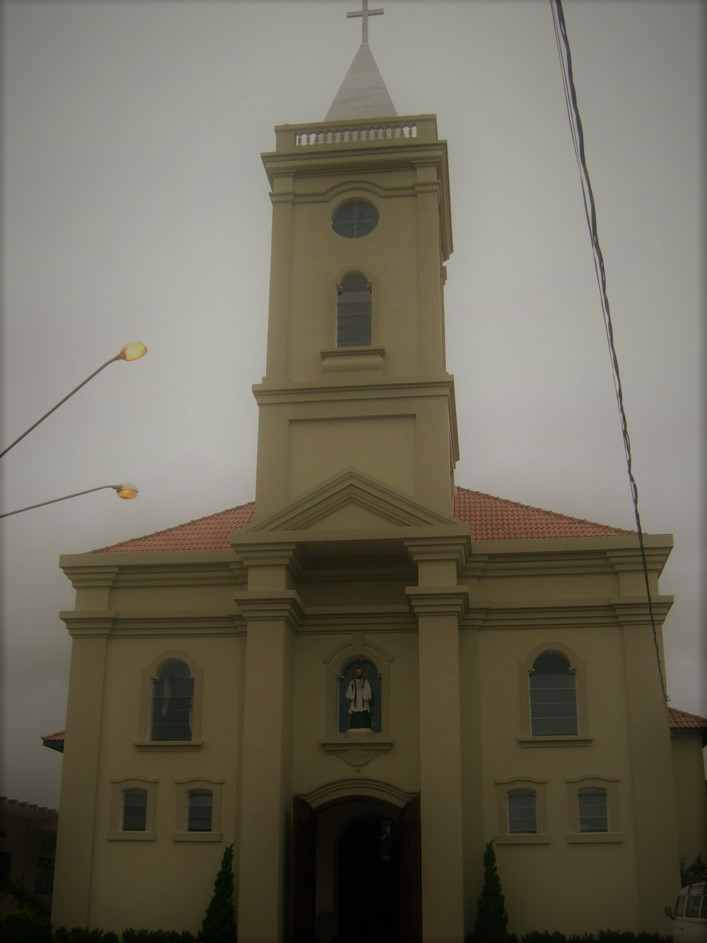
- Catedral São Francisco Xavier in 2020

Location
- Country: Brazil
- Ecclesiastical province: Sorocaba

Statistics
- Area: 13,400 km^{2} (5,200 sq mi)
- Population: Total; Catholics: (as of 2004); 290,000; 137,091 (47.3%)

Information
- Rite: Latin Rite
- Established: 19 January 1974 (52 years ago)
- Cathedral: Catedral São Francisco Xavier

Current leadership
- Pope: Leo XIV
- Bishop: Manoel Ferreira dos Santos, Júnior, M.S.C.
- Metropolitan Archbishop: Júlio Endi Akamine, S.A.C.
- Bishops emeritus: José Luíz Bertanha, S.V.D.

Website
- www.diocesederegistro.com.br

The Roman Catholic Diocese of Registro (Latin: Dioecesis Registrensis) is a diocese located in the city of Registro in the ecclesiastical province of Sorocaba in Brazil.

== History ==
- 19 January 1974, established as Diocese of Registro from the Diocese of Itapeva and Diocese of Santos.

== Special churches ==
- Minor Basilicas:
  - Basílica Nossa Senhora das Neves e Bom Jesus, Iguape

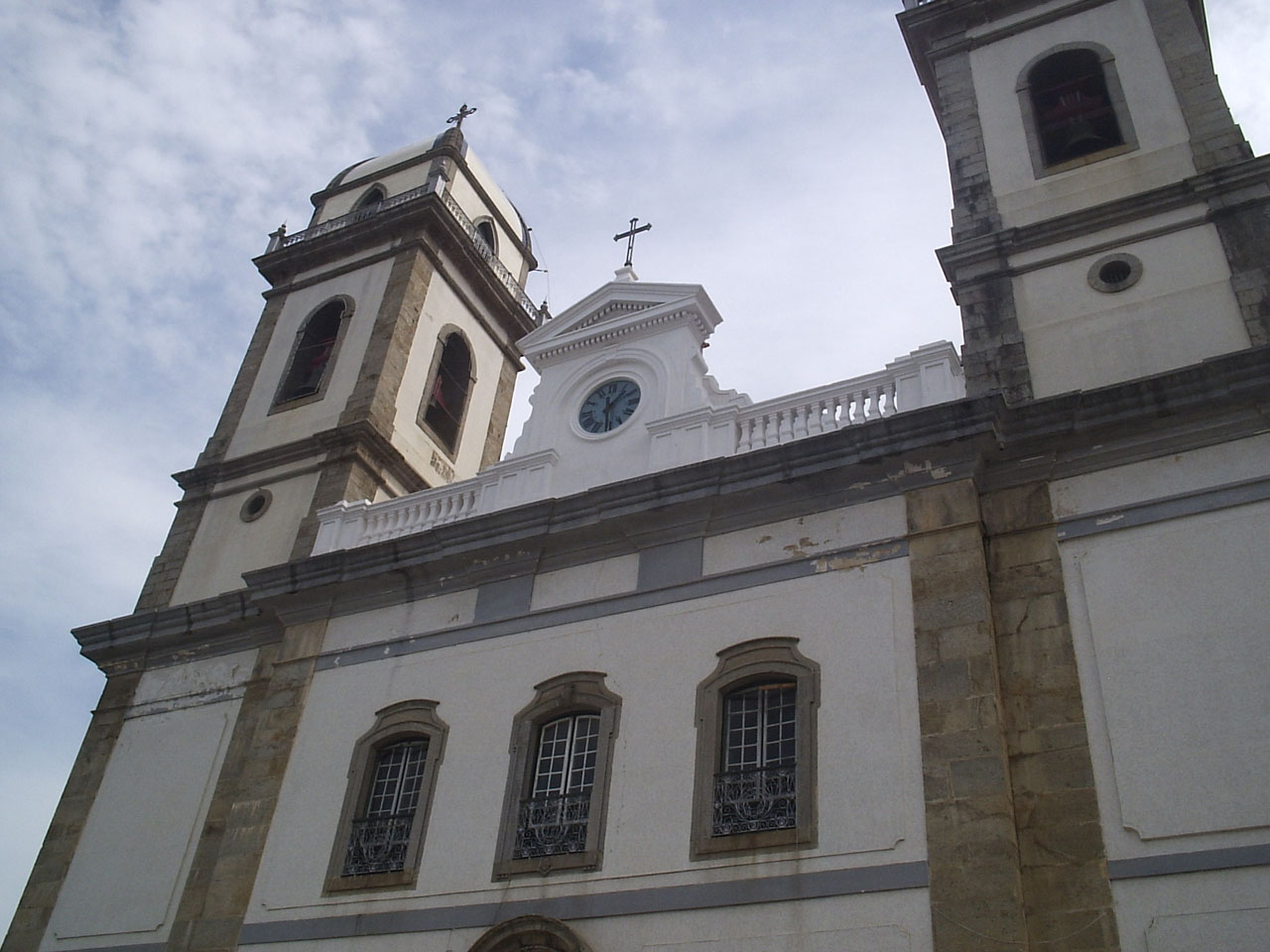
Basílica Nossa Senhora das Neves e Bom Jesus

== Leadership ==
- Bishops of Registro (Roman Rite), in reverse chronological order
  - Bishop Manoel Ferreira dos Santos, Júnior, M.S.C. (16 May 2018 - present)
  - Bishop José Luíz Bertanha, S.V.D. (26 May 1998 – 16 May 2018)
  - Bishop Apparecido José Dias, S.V.D. (13 December 1974 – 26 June 1996), appointed Bishop of Roraima, Roraima
