= Diocese of Itapetininga =

Catholic ecclesiastical territory

Coordinates: 23.5908°S 48.0534°W

Diocese of Itapetininga Dioecesis Itapetiningensis

Catholic
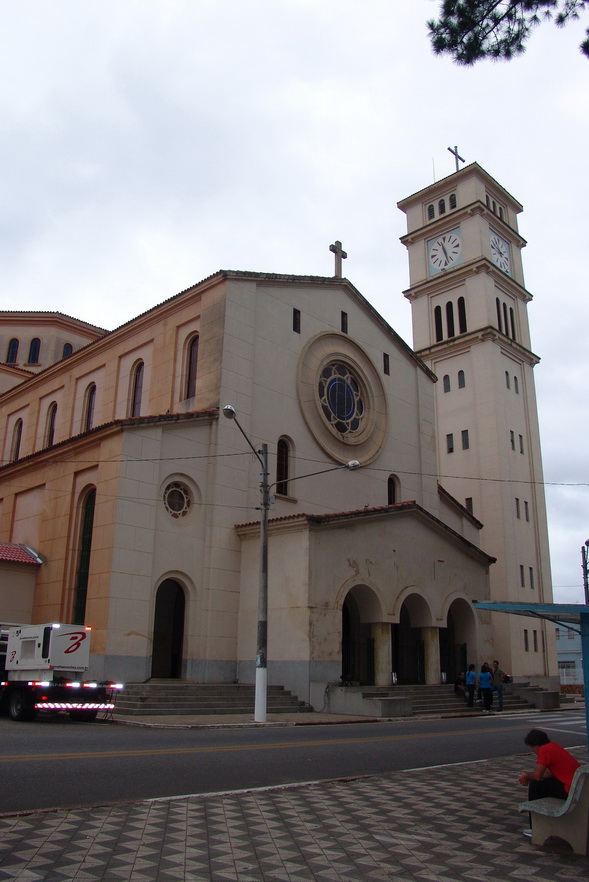
- Catedral Nossa Senhora dos Prazeres in 2009

Location
- Country: Brazil
- Ecclesiastical province: Sorocaba

Statistics
- Area: 1,870 km^{2} (720 sq mi)
- Population: Total; Catholics: (as of 2004); 635,000; 546,000 (86.0%)

Information
- Rite: Latin Rite
- Established: 15 April 1998 (28 years ago)
- Cathedral: Catedral Nossa Senhora dos Prazeres

Current leadership
- Pope: Leo XIV
- Bishop: Gorgônio Alves da Encarnação Neto, C.R.
- Metropolitan Archbishop: Júlio Endi Akamine, S.A.C.

Website
- www.diocesedeitapetininga.com.br

The Roman Catholic Diocese of Itapetininga (Latin: Dioecesis Itapetiningensis) is a diocese located in the city of Itapetininga in the ecclesiastical province of Sorocaba in Brazil.

== History ==
- 15 April 1998: Established as Diocese of Itapetininga from the Diocese of Itapeva and Metropolitan Archdiocese of Sorocaba

== Leadership ==
- Bishops of Itapetininga (Roman rite)
  - Bishop Gorgônio Alves da Encarnação Neto, C.R. (April 15, 1998 – present)
