= João Oneres Marchiori =

Brazilian Roman Catholic bishop

- Bishop of Lages
- Church: Catholic Church
- Diocese: Diocese of Lages
- In office: 18 February 1987 – 11 November 2009
- Predecessor: Honorato Piazera
- Successor: Irineu Andreassa
- Previous posts: Coadjutor Bishop of Lages (1983-1987); Bishop of Caçador (1977-1983)

Orders
- Ordination: 21 February 1960
- Consecration: 17 April 1977 by Carmine Rocco

Personal details
- Born: 2 May 1933 Carazinho, São Pedro do Rio Grande do Sul, Republic of the United States of Brazil
- Died: 27 June 2017 (aged 84) Lages, Santa Catarina, Brazil

João Oneres Marchiori (2 May 1933 – 27 June 2017) was a Brazilian Roman Catholic bishop.

Ordained to the priesthood in 1960, Marchiori served as bishop of the Roman Catholic Diocese of Caçador, Brazil from 1977 to 1983. He then served as coadjutor bishop of the Roman Catholic Diocese of Lages from 1983 to 1987 and diocesan bishop of the Lages Diocese from 1987 to 2009.
