= Warwick Estevam Kerr =

Brazilian scientist (1922–2018)

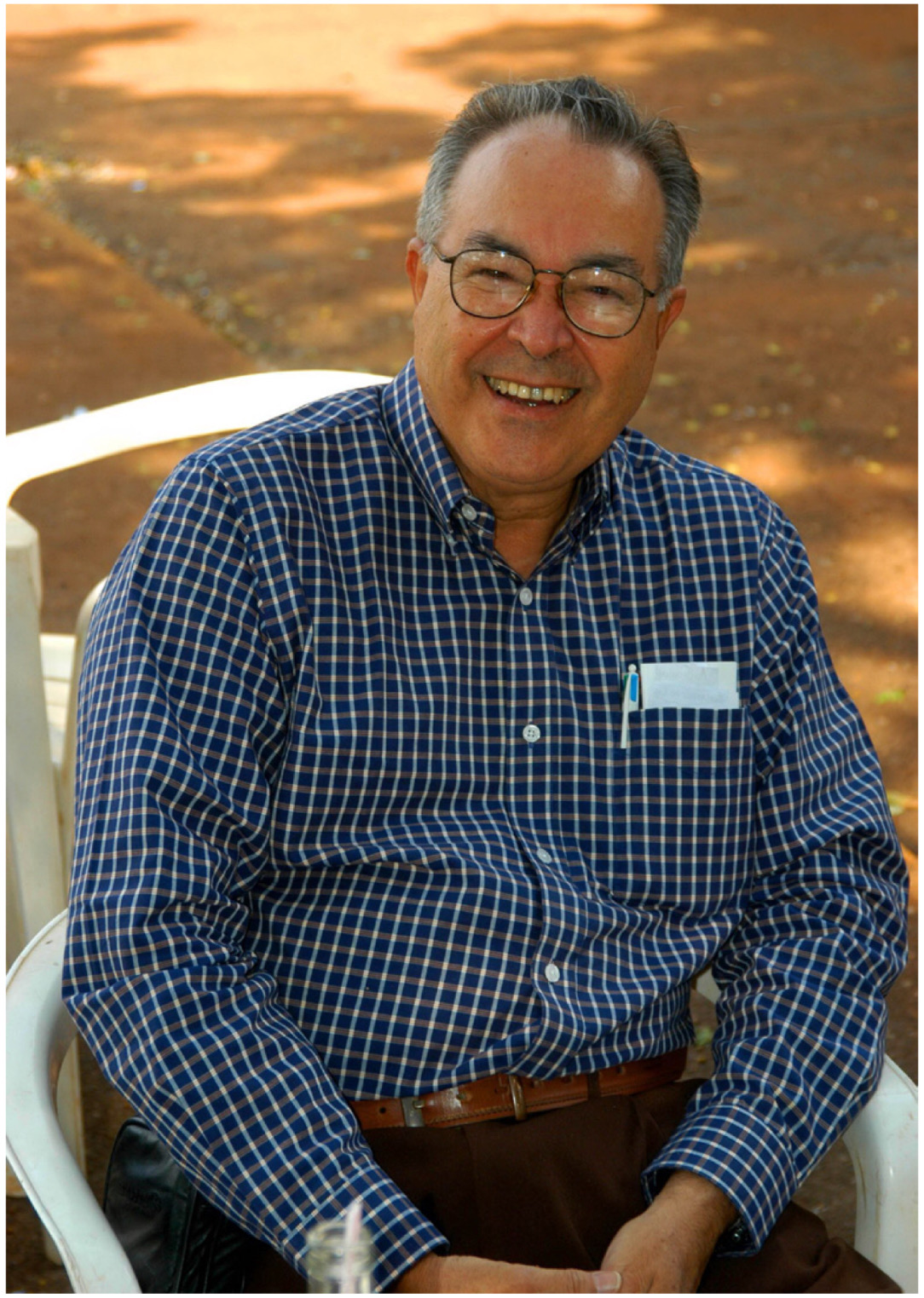
- 2009
- Born: 9 September 1922; Santana do Parnaíba, São Paulo, Brazil
- Died: 15 September 2018 (aged 96); Ribeirão Preto, São Paulo
- Education: Mackenzie Presbyterian University, São Paulo; University of São Paulo (D.Sc.)
- Known for: Work on sex determination of bees
- Awards: National Order of Scientific Merit
- Scientific career
- Fields: Agricultural engineering, genetics, entomology
- Institutions: Columbia University; National Institute of Amazonian Research; Universidade Estadual do Maranhão; Universidade Federal de Uberlândia
- Academic advisors: Theodosius Dobzhansky

Warwick Estevam Kerr (9 September 1922 – 15 September 2018) was a Brazilian agricultural engineer, biologist and professor notable for his discoveries in the genetics and sex determination of bees.

The Africanized bee in the western hemisphere is directly descended from 26 Tanzanian queen bees (Apis mellifera scutellata) accidentally released by one of his assistant bee-keepers. When reassembling a hive, the assistant forgot to install the queen excluder. This occurred in 1957 in Rio Claro, São Paulo in the southeast of Brazil from hives operated by Kerr, who had interbred honey bees from Europe and southern Africa.

== Biography ==
Kerr was born in 1922 in Santana do Parnaíba, São Paulo, Brazil, the son of Américo Caldas Kerr and Bárbara Chaves Kerr. The Kerr family immigrated by way of the United States. His family is originally from Scotland. The family moved to Pirapora do Bom Jesus, São Paulo, in 1925. He attended secondary school and the preparatory course at the Mackenzie in São Paulo and subsequently was admitted to the Escola Superior de Agricultura Luiz de Queiroz of the University of São Paulo, at Piracicaba, São Paulo, where he graduated as agricultural engineer.

From March 1975 to April 1979, Kerr moved to Manaus, as director of the National Institute of Amazonia Research (INPA), a research institute of the National Council of Scientific and Technological Development (CNPq). He officially retired from the University of São Paulo in January 1981, but not from scientific life. Exactly eleven days later he accepted a position as Full Professor at the Universidade Estadual do Maranhão in São Luís, state of Maranhão, where he became responsible for creating the Department of Biology; and, for a short period (1987–1988) served also as Dean of the university. He moved to the Universidade Federal de Uberlândia, in Uberlândia, state of Minas Gerais, in February 1988, as a professor of genetics.

== Scientific contributions ==
His scientific life began in Piracicaba, where he received his doctorate (D.Sc.) and later was an assistant professor. In 1951, he did a postdoc at University of California, Davis and, in 1952, at Columbia University, where he studied with the famous geneticist Theodosius Dobzhansky

In 1958, he was invited by Professor Dias da Silveira to assist in organizing the Department of Biology at the Faculdade de Ciências do Rio Claro, of the recently created State University of São Paulo UNESP, in the city of Rio Claro, where he stayed until 1964, directing a research group on the genetics of bees, his main field of specialization. From 1962 to 1964, he served as the Scientific Director to organize the recently created São Paulo State Research Foundation (FAPESP).

In December 1964, he accepted the position of Full Professor of Genetics at the Faculty of Medicine of Ribeirão Preto of the University of São Paulo, during the creation of a new Department of Genetics. In this capacity, Kerr was able to establish a research center of excellence, particularly in the areas of entomological genetics and human genetics, and which trained many masters and doctoral students. The department included a new research and teaching area, that of mathematical biology and biostatistics; and was a pioneer in the use of computers in biology and medicine, particularly for genetics applied to animal husbandry.

In all these positions he never stopped his research on Meliponini, especially the genus Melipona, which is a genus of Neotropical bees that are frequently subject to the predatory action of wild honey gatherers (meleiros in Portuguese). Kerr became well known for his research on the hybridization of the African bee (Apis mellifera scutellata) and the Italian bee (Apis mellifera ligustica). Kerr has 620 publications on various subjects. Apart from being a member of the Brazilian Academy of Sciences, he was also a Foreign Associate of the National Academy of Sciences of the US, and of the Third World Academy of Sciences. He was admitted by President Itamar Franco to the National Order of Scientific Merit at the Grã-Cruz class in 1994.

== Selected papers ==
- W. E. Kerr; Gerace, L; Leister, F; Sofer, W (1975). "Evolution of the population structure in bees". Genetics. 79 (1): 73–84. doi:10.1093/genetics/79.1.73. PMC 1213261. PMID 1126622.
- W. E. Kerr (1976). "Population genetic studies in bees. 2 sex-limited genes". Evolution. 30 (1). Evolution, Vol. 30, No. 1: 94–99. doi:10.2307/2407676. JSTOR 2407676. PMID 28565044.
- W. E. Kerr (1987). "Sex determination in bees. XXI. Number of XO-heteroalleles in a natural population of Melipona compressipes fasciculata (Apidae)". Insectes Sociaux. 34 (4): 274–27. doi:10.1007/BF02224359. S2CID 31873645.
- W. E. Kerr & R. A. da Cunha (1990). "Sex determination in bees. XXVI Masculinism of workers in the Apidae". Brazilian Journal of Genetics. 13: 479–489.
- W. E. Kerr (1992). "The bee or not the bee?". The Times Literary Supplement.

== Sources ==
- Fundação Getulio Vargas: Warwick E. Kerr
- New York Times Article: Killer Bees
- Brazilian Journal of History
