= Osório Bebber =

Brazilian priest (1929–2021)

Osório Claudio Bebber OFMCap
- Bishop of Joaçaba
- Church: Catholic Church
- Diocese: Diocese of Joaçaba
- In office: 17 March 1999 – 9 April 2003
- Predecessor: Henrique Müller
- Successor: Walmir Alberto Valle
- Previous posts: Prelate of Coxim (1992-1999); Bishop of Tubarão (1981-1992); Coadjutor Bishop of Tubarão (1979-1981)

Orders
- Ordination: 13 February 1955 by Benedito Zorzi
- Consecration: 2 March 1980 by Carmine Rocco

Personal details
- Born: 11 June 1929 Flores da Cunha, São Pedro do Rio Grande do Sul
- Died: 13 August 2021 (aged 92) Caxias do Sul, Rio Grande do Sul, Brazil

Osório Claudio Bebber, OFMCap, (11 June 1929 – 13 August 2021) was a Brazilian Capuchin. He served as the second Bishop of the Diocese of Tubarão from 1981 to 1992, the Territorial Prelate of the Roman Catholic Diocese of Coxim from 1992 to 1999, and the second Bishop of the Roman Catholic Diocese of Joaçaba from 1999 until his retirement in April 2003. He remained Bishop emeritus of Joaçaba until his death in August 2021.

Bebber was born in Flores da Cunha, Rio Grande do Sul, to parents, Antônio Bebber Filho and Catharina Trentin Bebber. He was born and baptized as Claudino Bebber, but changed his name to Osório Bebber when he entered the Capuchin Province of Rio Grande do Sul's seminary at the age of 12. He was ordained as Catholic priest in 1956.

Bishop emeritus Osório Bebber died from post-surgical complications, including cardiogenic shock and heart failure, at the Hospital da Unimed in Caxias do Sul on August 13, 2021, at the age of 92. His funeral was held at the Immaculate Conception Church in Caxias do Sul. Bebber was buried in the Cemetery of the Chapel (Cemitério da Capela) in São Paulo.
