= José Thurler =

Brazilian Roman Catholic bishop

- Bishop of Chapecó
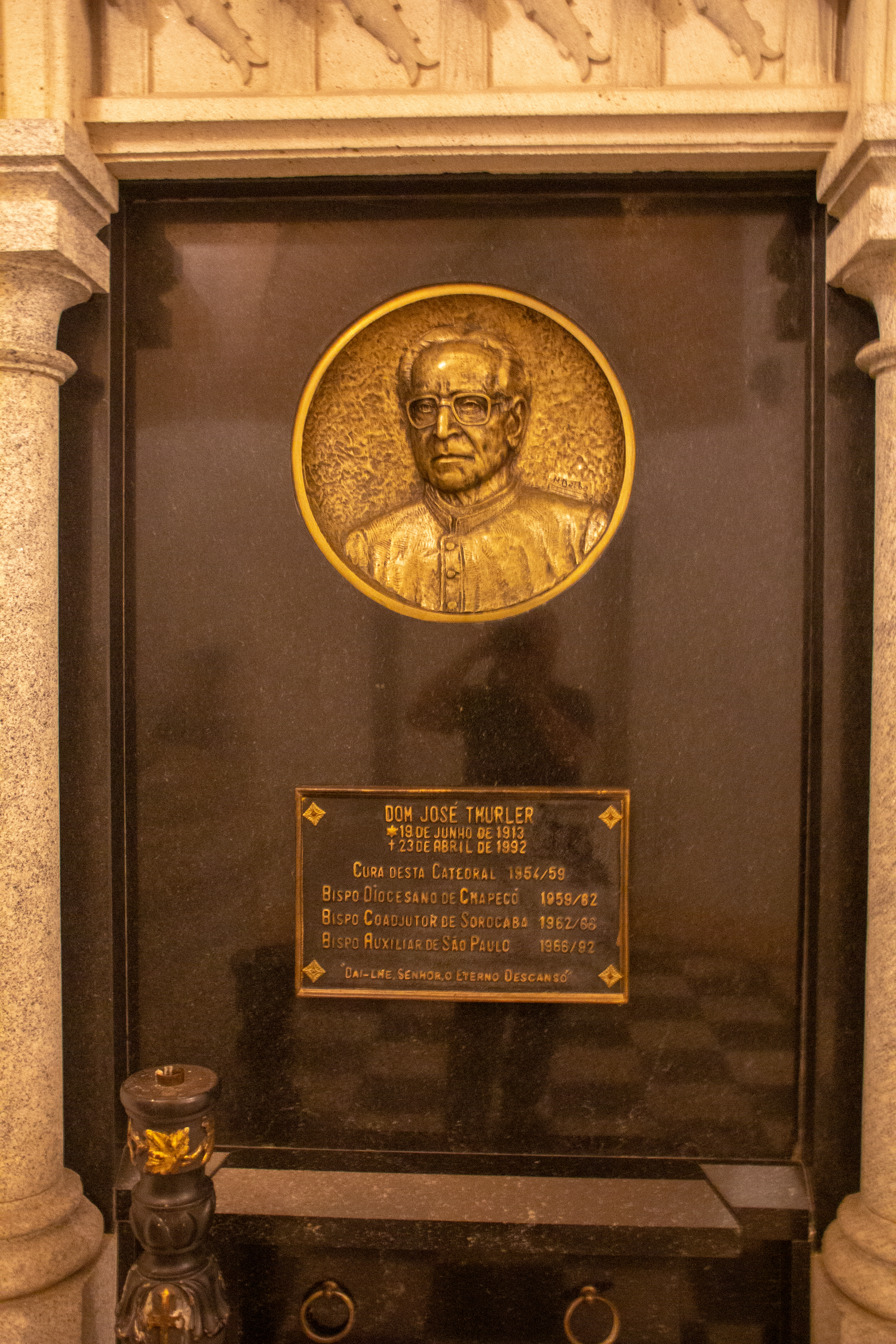
- Church: Catholic Church
- Diocese: Diocese of Chapecó
- In office: 12 February 1959 – 22 March 1962
- Predecessor: Diocese erected
- Successor: Wilson Laus Schmidt
- Other posts: Auxiliary Bishop of São Paulo (1966-1992); Titular Bishop of Capitolias (1962-1992); Coadjutor Bishop of Sorocaba (1962-1965)

Orders
- Ordination: 4 April 1942
- Consecration: 5 April 1959 by Armando Lombardi

Personal details
- Born: 19 June 1913 Nova Friburgo, Rio de Janeiro, Republic of the United States of Brazil
- Died: 23 April 1992 (aged 78)

José Thurler (19 June 1913–23 April 1992) was a Brazilian Roman Catholic bishop.

Thurler was born in Brazil and was ordained to the priesthood in 1942. He served as bishop of the Roman Catholic Diocese of Chapecó, Brazil, from 1959 to 1962. Thurler then served as titular bishop of Capitolias from 1962 until his death in 1992. He served as coadjutor bishop of the Roman Catholic Diocese of Sorocaba, Brazil, from 1962 to 1965. Thurler served as auxiliary bishop of the Roman Catholic Archdiocese of São Paulo from 1966 until his death.
