= Carmen Zanotto =

Brazilian politician (born 1962)

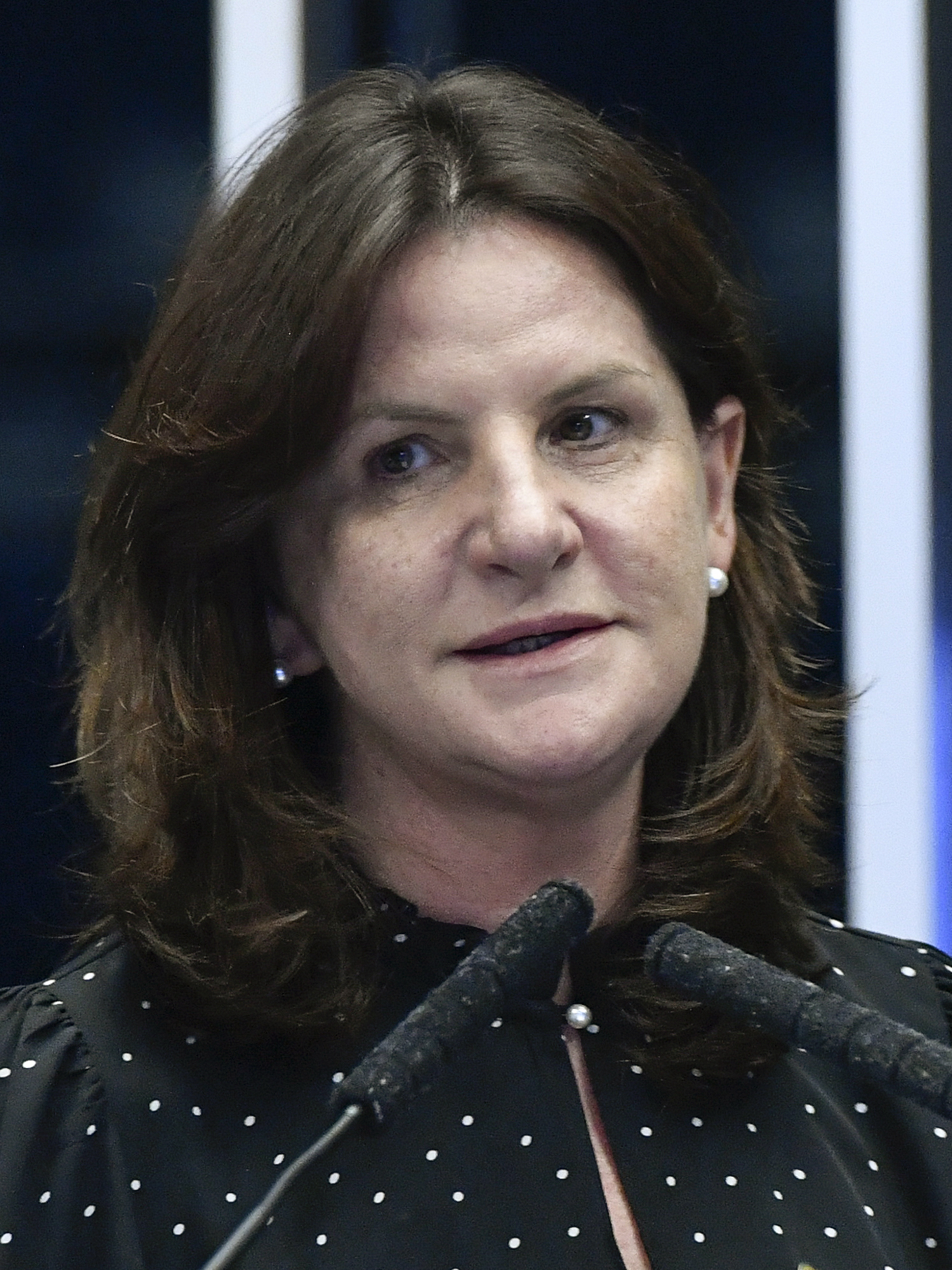
- Zanotto in 2020

Mayor of Lages
- Incumbent
- Assumed office 1 January 2025
- Preceded by: Antônio Ceron

Personal details
- Born: 6 October 1962 (age 64)
- Party: Cidadania (since 2019)

Carmen Emília Bonfá Zanotto (born 6 October 1962) is a Brazilian politician serving as mayor of Lages since 2025. From 2011 to 2025, she was a member of the Chamber of Deputies.
