= Archdiocese of Chapecó =

Catholic ecclesiastical territory

Coordinates: 27.1051°S 52.6138°W

Archdiocese of Chapecó Archidioecesis Xapecoënsis Arquidiocese de Chapecó
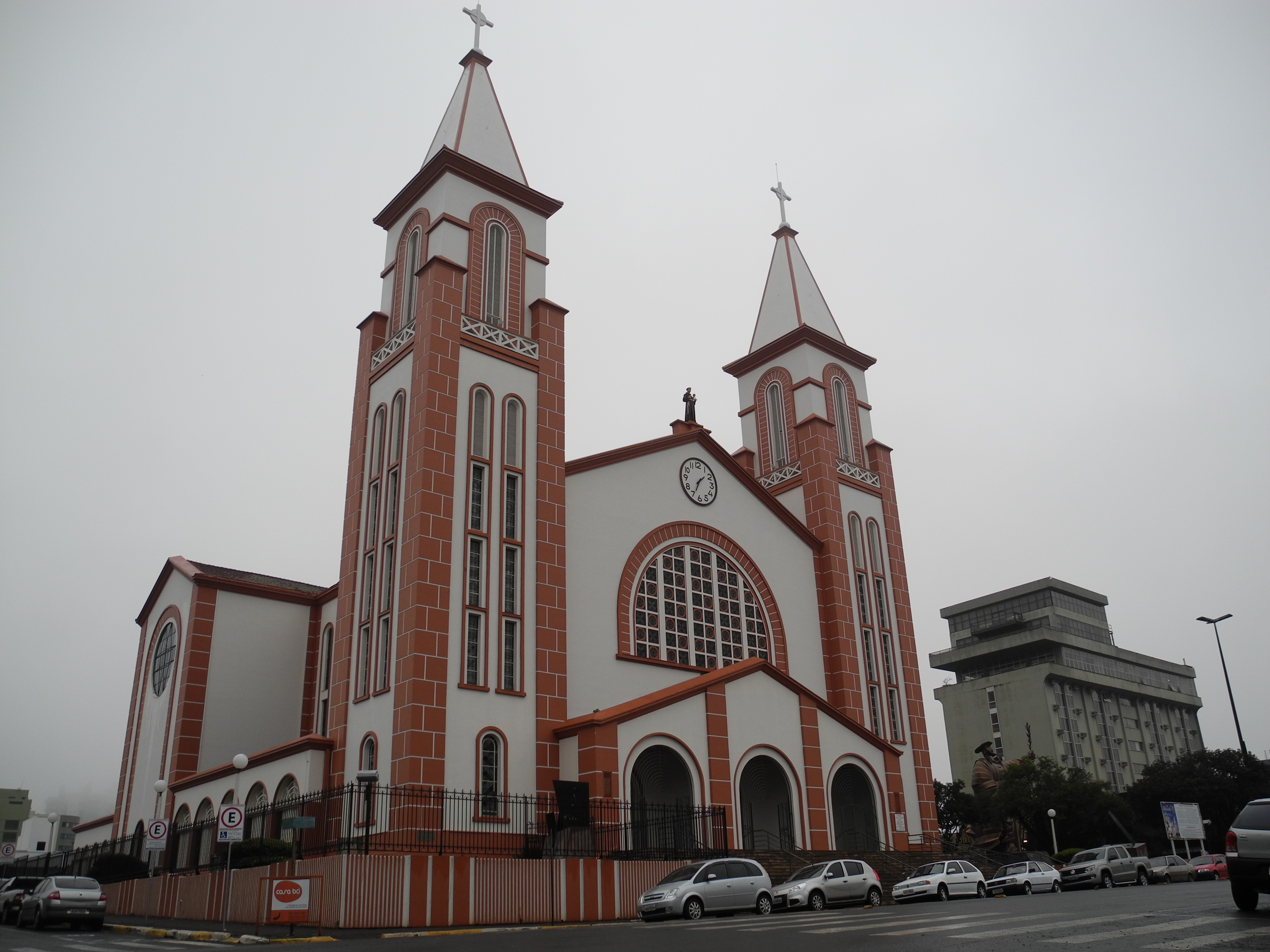
- Cathedral of St. Anthony of Padua

- Coat of arms

Location
- Country: Brazil
- Ecclesiastical province: Chapecó

Statistics
- Area: 15,663 km^{2} (6,048 sq mi)
- Population: Total; Catholics: (as of 2006); 715,000; 593,000 (82.9%)

Information
- Rite: Latin Rite
- Established: 14 January 1958 (67 years ago)
- Cathedral: Cathedral of St Anthony of Padua in Chapecó

Current leadership
- Pope: Leo XIV
- Metropolitan Archbishop: Odelir José Magri, MCCI

Website
- www.diocesechapeco.org.br

The Roman Catholic Archdiocese of Chapecó (Latin: Archidioecesis Xapecoënsis) is an archdiocese located in the city of Chapecó, Brazil. It was in the ecclesiastical province of Florianópolis until the elevation to its current status in 2024.

== History ==
- January 14, 1958: Established as Diocese of Chapecó from the Diocese of Lages and Metropolitan Archdiocese of Palmas

== Leadership ==
- Bishops of Chapecó (Roman rite), in reverse chronological order
  - Bishop Odelir José Magri, MCCI (2014.12.03 – 2024.11.05) elevated to archbishop, see below
  - Bishop Manoel João Francisco (1998.10.28 – 2014.03.26)
  - Bishop José Gomes (1968.07.16 – 1998.10.28)
  - Bishop Wilson Laus Schmidt (1962.05.18 – 1968.01.22)
  - Bishop José Thurler (1959.02.12 – 1962.03.22)
- Metropolitan archbishop of Chapecó (Roman rite), in chronological order
  - Archbishop Odelir José Magri, MCCI (2024.11.05 – present)

== Suffragan dioceses ==
- Diocese of Lages
- Diocese of Caçador
- Diocese of Joaçaba
