= Walmir Alberto Valle =

Brazilian Roman Catholic bishop (1938–2019)

Walmir Alberto Valle IMC
- Bishop of Joaçaba
- Church: Catholic Church
- Diocese: Diocese of Joaçaba
- In office: 9 April 2003 – 14 April 2010
- Predecessor: Osório Bebber
- Successor: Mário Marquez
- Previous posts: Coadjutor Bishop of Joaçaba (2002-2003); Bishop of Zé Doca (1991-2002); Bishop of Cândido Mendes (1985-1991)

Orders
- Ordination: 21 December 1963
- Consecration: 6 January 1986 by Pope John Paul II

Personal details
- Born: 14 April 1938 Nova Trento, Santa Catarina, Republic of the United States of Brazil
- Died: 26 August 2019 (aged 81) Joaçaba, Santa Catarina, Brazil

Walmir Alberto Valle (14 April 1938 – 26 August 2019) was a Brazilian Roman Catholic bishop.

Valle was born in Brazil and was ordained to the priesthood in 1963. He served as bishop of the Roman Catholic Diocese of Zé Doca, Brazil, from 1991 to 2002. Valle then served as coadjutor bishop of the Roman Catholic Diocese of Joaçaba, Brazil, in 2002 and 2003. He served as bishop of the Joaçaba Diocese from 2003 until 2010.
