= Susana Dias =

Paulista explorer (1553–1634)

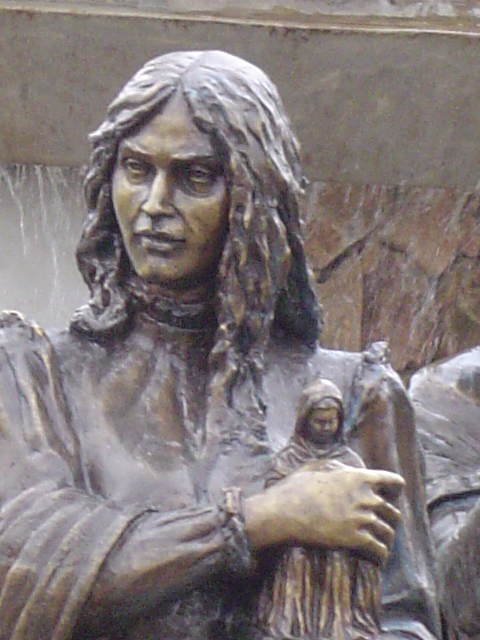
- A monument of Susana Dias in Santana de Parnaíba
- Born: Susana Dias c. 1553; Captaincy of São Vicente, Colonial Brazil, Kingdom of Portugal
- Died: September 2, 1634; Parnahyba, Colonial Brazil, Kingdom of Portugal (present-day Santana de Parnaíba, Brazil)
- Spouses: Manoel Fernandes; Belchior da Costa (before 1625)
- Children: 19
- Parent(s): Pero Lopes (father); Beatriz Dias (mother)

Susana Dias (c. 1553 – 2 September 1634) was a Paulista woman who, along with her son captain André Fernandes, founded the city of Parnahyba in the Captaincy of São Vicente, which would become the modern-day city of Santana de Parnaíba, São Paulo, Brazil.

Dias was born around 1553 to Pero Lopes, of Portuguese background, and Beatriz Dias, of Indigenous background. Susana's grandfather was cacique Tibiriçá. She established a farm in 1580 on the banks of the Anhembi River (later called the Tietê River), as part of further Portuguese colonization into the interior of the continent in search of minerals and Indigenous slaves. She erected a well dedicated to Saint Anne to whom she was devoted to on the land, to which the current city of Santana de Parnaíba derives its name. It is estimated that one of her sons, André, was two at the time of the establishment of the city, but the municipality was installed in 1625 under his influence to become a separate municipality from the larger São Paulo dos Campos de Piratininga, the predecessor to the current city of São Paulo.

She was married twice; First to Manoel Fernandes, and second to Belchior da Costa, the latter ending in 1625. Between them she had 19 children. Many of these children became bandeirantes themselves, going further into Brazil in search minerals and Indigenous slaves. These children included André; Domingos Fernandes, who would later establish the city of Itu; and Baltasar Fernandes, one of the founders of the city of Sorocaba.
