= Sorocaba Metropolitan Cathedral =

Church in Sorocaba, Brazil

Sorocaba Metropolitan Cathedral of "Nossa Senhora da ponte"
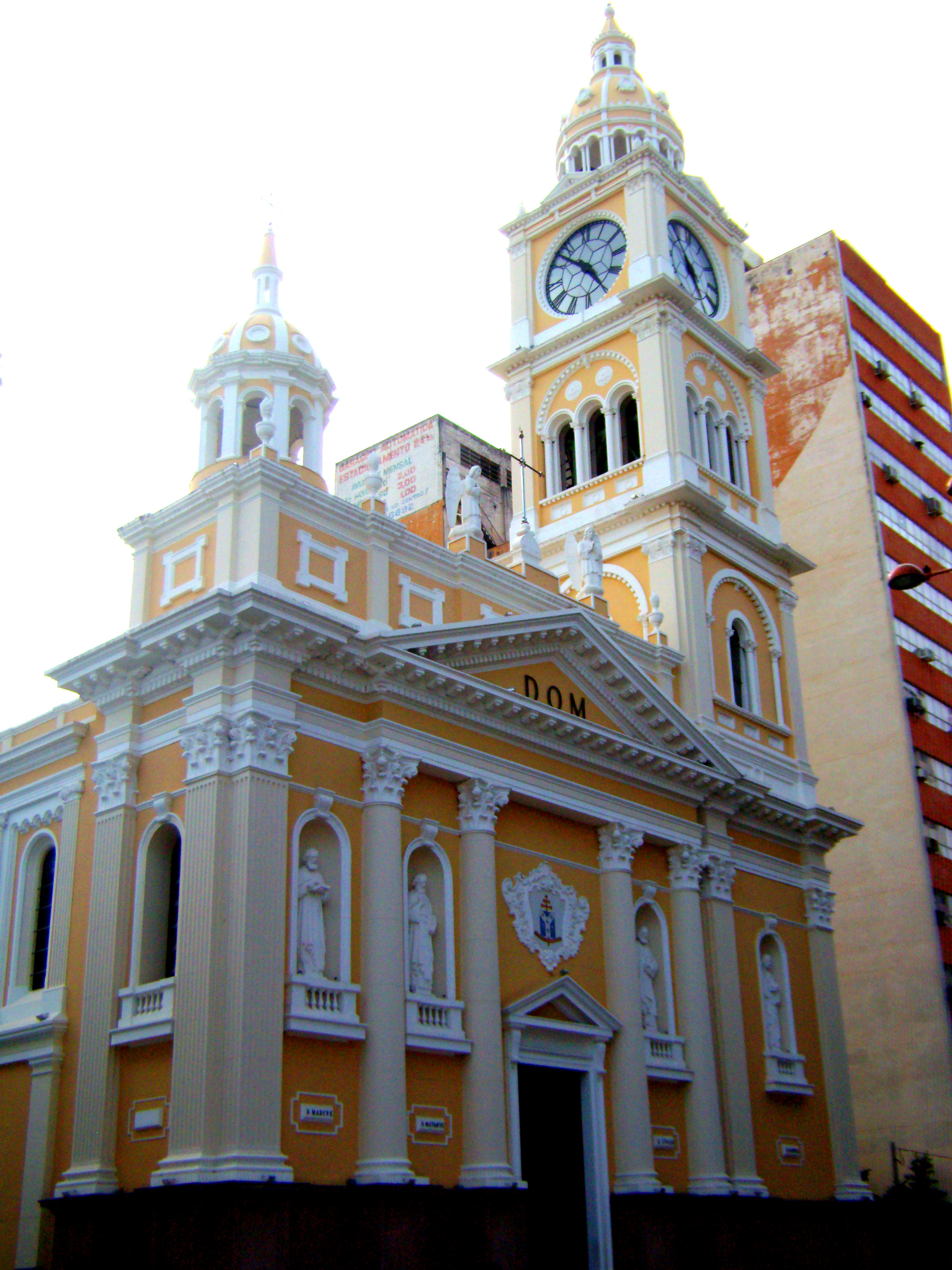

Religion
- Affiliation: Roman Catholic
- Province: Archdiocese of Sorocaba
- Leadership: Archbishop Júlio Endi Akamine
- Status: Active

Location
- Location: Sorocaba, Brazil.
- Interactive map of Sorocaba Metropolitan Cathedral of "Nossa Senhora da ponte"
- Coordinates: 23°29′59.43″S 47°27′30.64″W

Architecture
- Type: Cathedral
- Style: Baroque
- Completed: 1771

Specifications
- Direction of façade: Northeast
- Dome: 1

Website
- Official website

The Sorocaba Metropolitan Cathedral or Metropolitan Cathedral of "Nossa Senhora da Ponte", home of Archdiocese of Sorocaba, located in the Plaza Coronel Fernando Prestes in downtown area of the city of Sorocaba, São Paulo, Brazil. It was built over 200 years ago.

The cathedral is derived from the mother church of the second city, founded in 1771 when he arrived in Portugal the image Nossa Senhora da Ponte, which currently is at the main altar in style Baroque, 1771. The first church was the Church of Sant'anna, current Monastery of São Bento (Sorocaba). This curious invocation of "Nossa Senhora" (Our Lady), common in Portugal, is unique in Brazil. The first mass in the matrix "Nossa Senhora da Ponte" colonial was held in 1783.

The current church building is the result of a reshuffle carried out from the end of 19th century. In 1924 the cathedral was consecrated as a matrix for Duarte Leopoldo e Silva, Archbishop of São Paulo. The first bishop was Dom Jose Carlos Aguirre, the Bishop Aguirre. It has remarkable architecture and beautiful artistic details. The interior paintings by Ernesto Tomazzini (1930) and Bruno Giusti (1949). The giant bell was installed in its tower, was cast in Sorocaba (1940), by brothers Samassa, who used 50 kg of gold in order to sound quality.

At the top of the cathedral is the Archdiocesan Museum of Sacred Art of Sorocaba that will soon operate in the big house on the Square of São Bento, also in downtown of Sorocaba.

== See also ==
- Sorocaba
