= Otacílio Costa =

Coordinates: 27°34′S 50°07′W

- Municipality
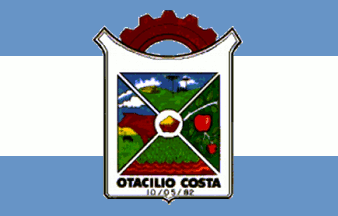
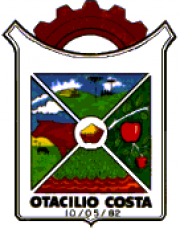
- Flag Coat of arms
- Interactive map of Otacílio Costa
- Country: Brazil
- Region: South
- State: Santa Catarina
- Mesoregion: Serrana

Population (2025)
  - Total: 17,873
  - Urban Settlement: 15,983
- Time zone: UTC -3

Otacílio Costa is a municipality in the state of Santa Catarina in the South region of Brazil.

== History ==
Otacílio Costa became municipality on 10 May 1982.

== Climate ==
According to Köppen climate classification, it is classified as oceanic climate (Köppen: Cfb), with cool summers, with an average annual temperature of 15.9 °C.

== See also ==
- List of municipalities in Santa Catarina
