= Roman Catholic Archdiocese of Sorocaba =

Latin Catholic jurisdiction in Brazil

Coordinates: 23.5003°S 47.4584°W

Archdiocese of Sorocaba Archidioecesis Sorocabana

Catholic
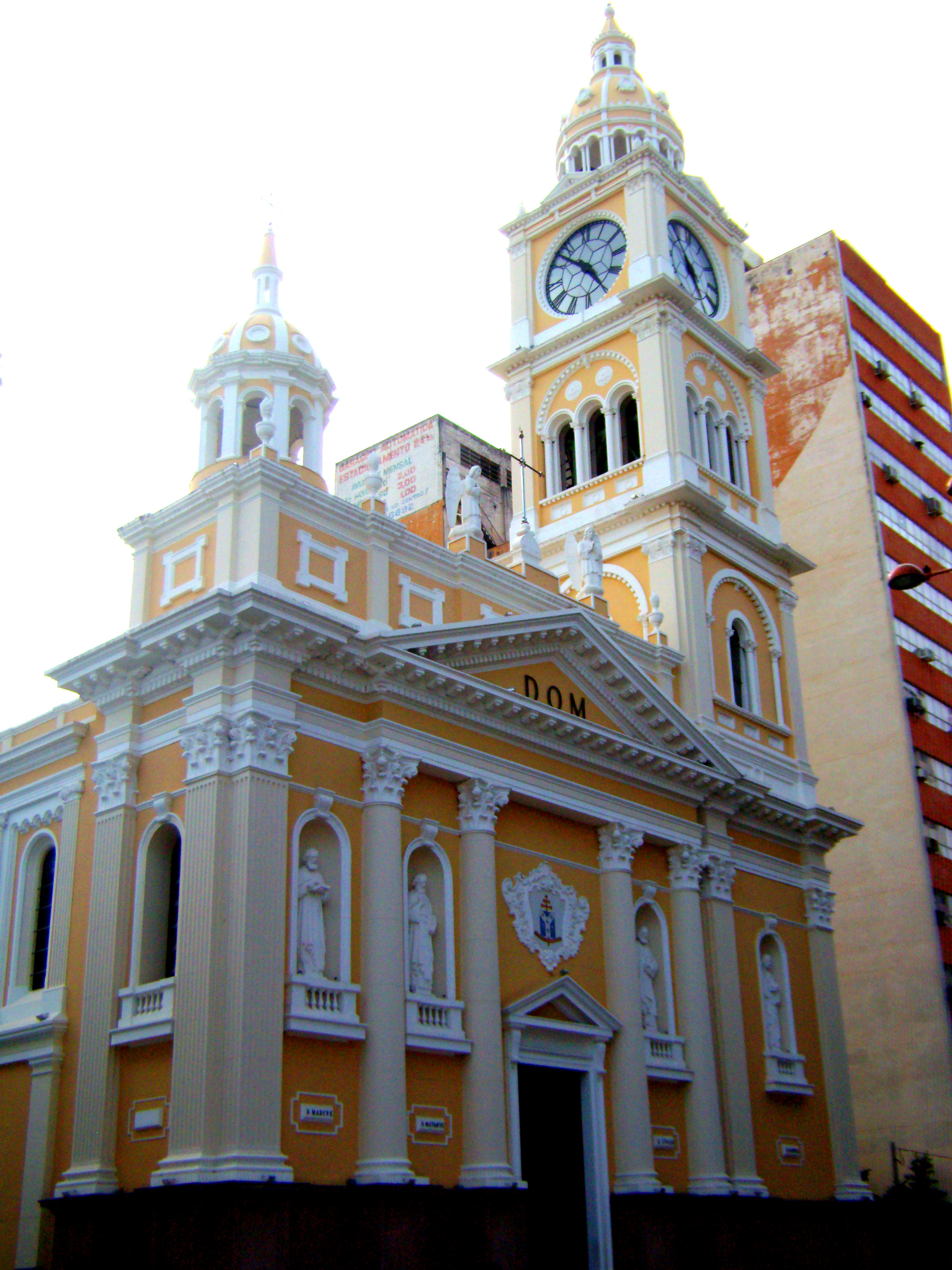

- Coat of arms

Location
- Country: Brazil
- Ecclesiastical province: Sorocaba

Statistics
- Area: 4,178 km^{2} (1,613 sq mi)
- Population: Total; Catholics: (as of 2004); 935,414; 654,789 (70.0%)

Information
- Denomination: Catholic Church
- Sui iuris church: Latin Church
- Rite: Roman Rite
- Established: 4 July 1924 (102 years ago)
- Cathedral: Catedral Metropolitana Nossa Senhora da Ponte

Current leadership
- Pope: Leo XIV
- Archbishop-designate: Dom. José Roberto Fortes Palau
- Bishops emeritus: Eduardo Benes de Sales Rodrigues

Website
- www.arquidiocesesorocaba.org.br

The Archdiocese of Sorocaba (Latin: Archidioecesis Sorocabana) is a Latin Church archdiocese of the Catholic Church located in the city of Sorocaba in Brazil.

== History ==
- 4 July 1924: Established as Diocese of Sorocaba from the Diocese of Botucatu, Metropolitan Archdiocese of São Paulo and Diocese of Taubaté
- 29 April 1992: Promoted as Metropolitan Archdiocese of Sorocaba

== Bishops ==
=== Ordinaries, in reverse chronological order ===
- Metropolitan Archbishops of Sorocaba, below
  - Archbishop José Roberto Fortes Palau (2025.08.06 - present)
  - Archbishop Júlio Endi Akamine, S.A.C. (2016.12.28 - 2025.08.06)
  - Archbishop Eduardo Benes de Sales Rodrigues (2005.05.04 – 2016.12.28)
  - Archbishop José Lambert Filho, C.S.S. (1992.04.29 – 2005.05.04)
- Bishops of Sorocaba, below
  - Bishop José Lambert Filho, C.S.S. (later Archbishop) (1981.03.20 – 1992.04.29)
  - Bishop José Melhado Campos (1973.01.08 – 1981.03.20)
  - Bishop José Carlos de Aguirre (1924.07.04 – 1973.01.08)

=== Coadjutor bishops ===
- José Thurler (1962–1965), did not succeed to see; resigned; appointed Auxiliary Bishop of São Paulo in 1966
- José Melhado Campos (1965–1973)
- José Lambert Filho, C.S.S. (1979–1981)

=== Auxiliary bishops ===
- Almir Marques Ferreira (1957–1961), appointed Bishop of Uberlândia, Minas Gerais
- Amaury Castanho (1976–1979), appointed Bishop of Valença, Rio de Janeiro

=== Other priests of this diocese who became bishops ===
- Antônio Maria Mucciolo, appointed Bishop of Barretos, São Paulo in 1977
- José Benedito Cardoso (priest here, 1986–1998), appointed Auxiliary Bishop of São Paulo in 2019

== Suffragan dioceses ==
- Diocese of Itapetininga
- Diocese of Itapeva
- Diocese of Jundiaí
- Diocese of Registro

== Sources ==
- GCatholic.org
- Catholic Hierarchy
- Archdiocese website (Portuguese)
