= Diocese of Caçador =

Catholic ecclesiastical territory

Coordinates: 26.7752°S 51.0137°W

Diocese of Caçador Dioecesis Captatoropolitana Diocese de Caçador
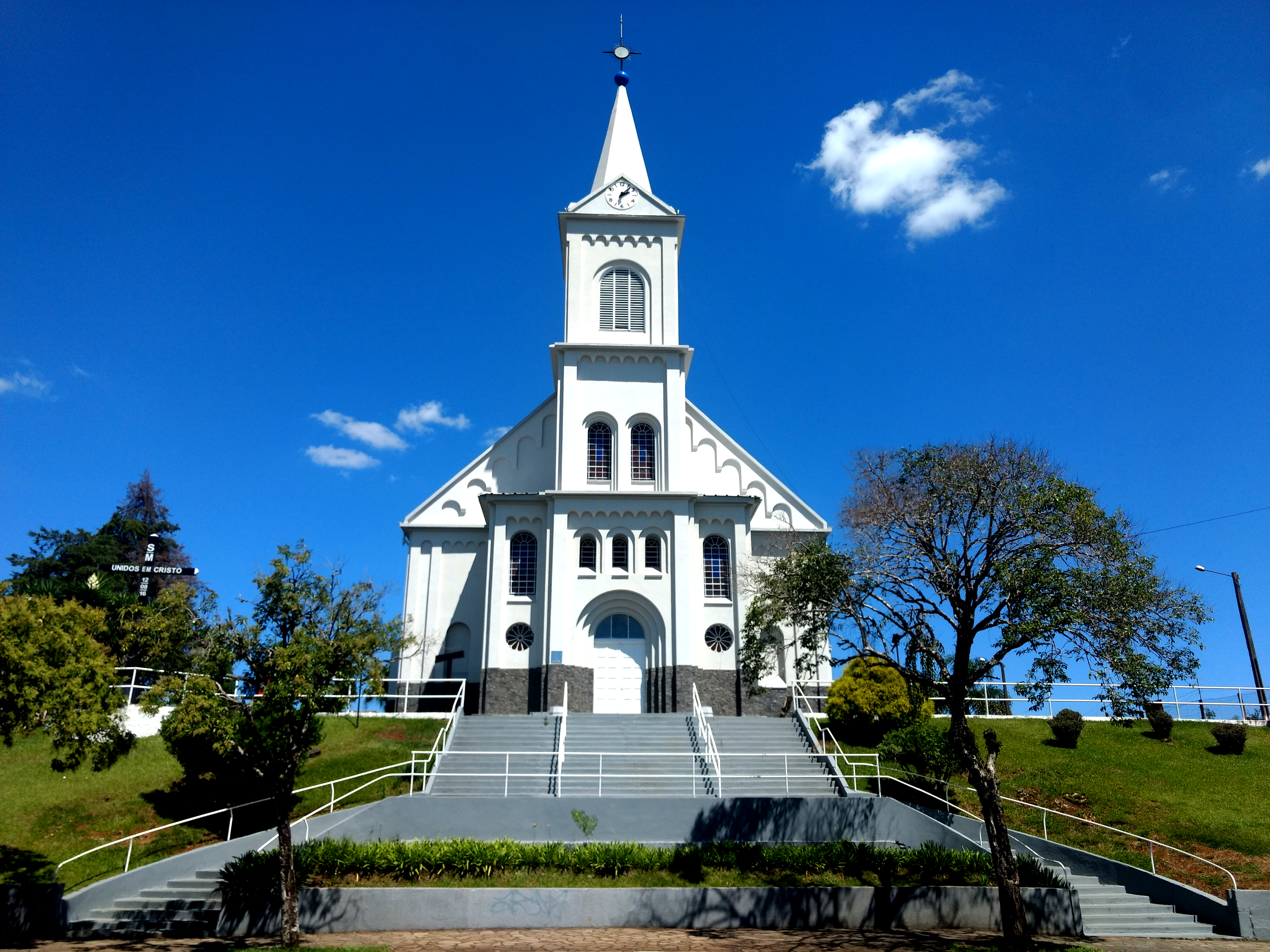
- Cathedral of St. Francis of Assisi

Location
- Country: Brazil
- Ecclesiastical province: Chapecó
- Metropolitan: Chapecó

Statistics
- Area: 12,398 km^{2} (4,787 sq mi)
- Population: Total; Catholics: (as of 2006); 376,000; 286,000 (76.1%)

Information
- Rite: Latin Rite
- Established: 23 November 1968 (57 years ago)
- Cathedral: Cathedral of St Francis of Assisi in Caçador

Current leadership
- Pope: Leo XIV
- Bishop: Cleocir Bonetti
- Metropolitan Archbishop: Odelir José Magri, MCCI
- Bishops emeritus: Luíz Carlos Eccel; Severino Clasen

Website
- Website of the Diocese

The Roman Catholic Diocese of Caçador (Latin: Dioecesis Captatoropolitana) is a diocese located in the city of Caçador in the ecclesiastical province of Chapecó in Brazil.

== History ==
- November 23, 1968: Established as Diocese of Caçador from the Diocese of Lages

== Bishops of Caçador ==
- Orlando Octacílio Dotti, O.F.M. Cap. (12 March 1969 Appointed - 1 April 1976 Appointed, Bishop of Barra (do Rio Grande), Baia)
- João Oneres Marchiori (25 January 1977 Appointed - 18 April 1983 Appointed, Coadjutor Bishop of Lages, Santa Catarina)
- Luiz Colussi (5 December 1983 Appointed - 4 December 1996 Died)
- Luíz Carlos Eccel (18 November 1998 Appointed - 24 November 2010 Resigned)
- Severino Clasen, O.F.M. (6 July 2011 Appointed – 1 July 2020 Appointed, Archbishop of Maringá, Parana)
- Cleocir Bonetti (30 June 2021 Appointed – present)
