= Lages =

- Municipality
- Municipality of Lages
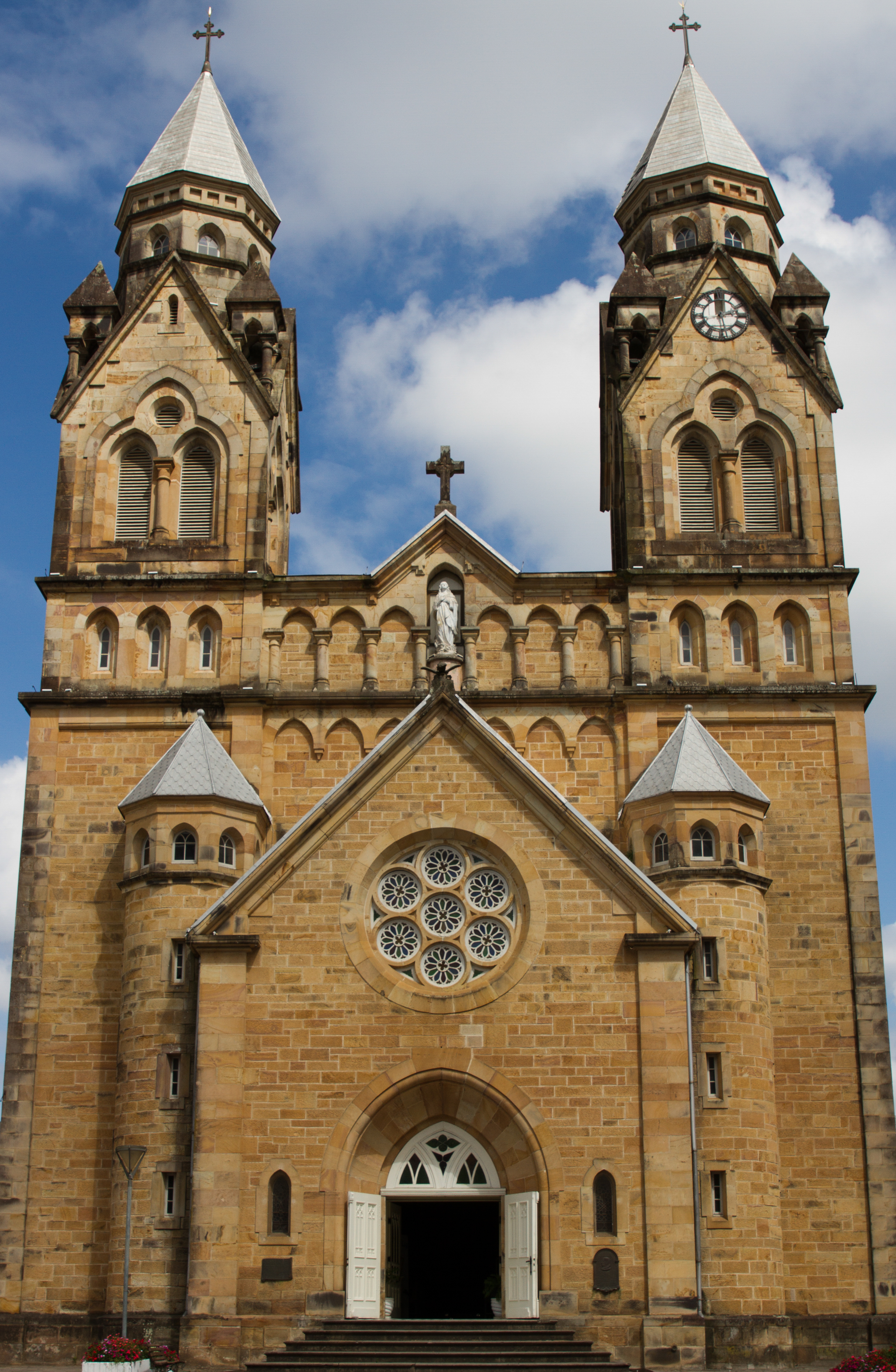
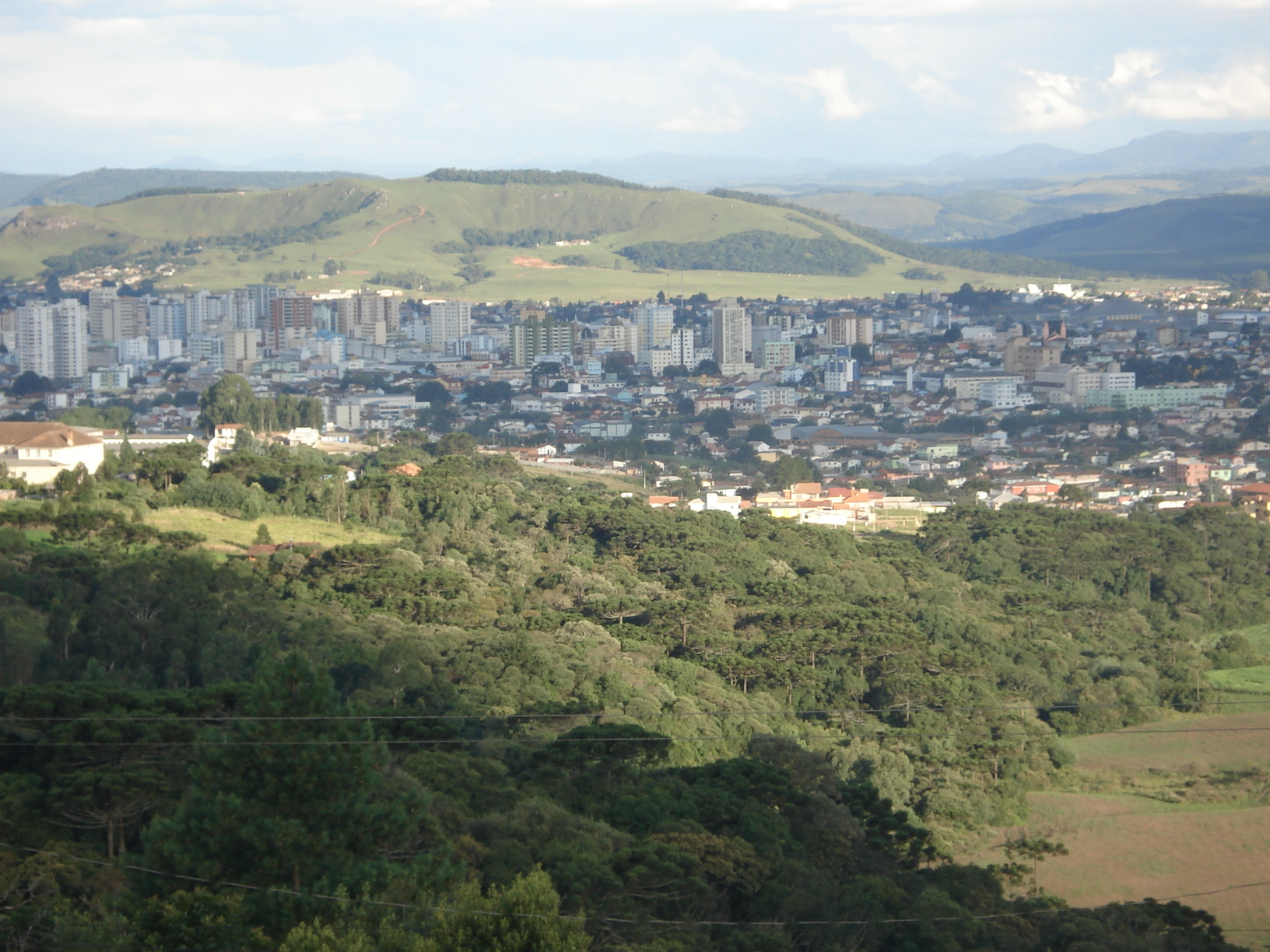
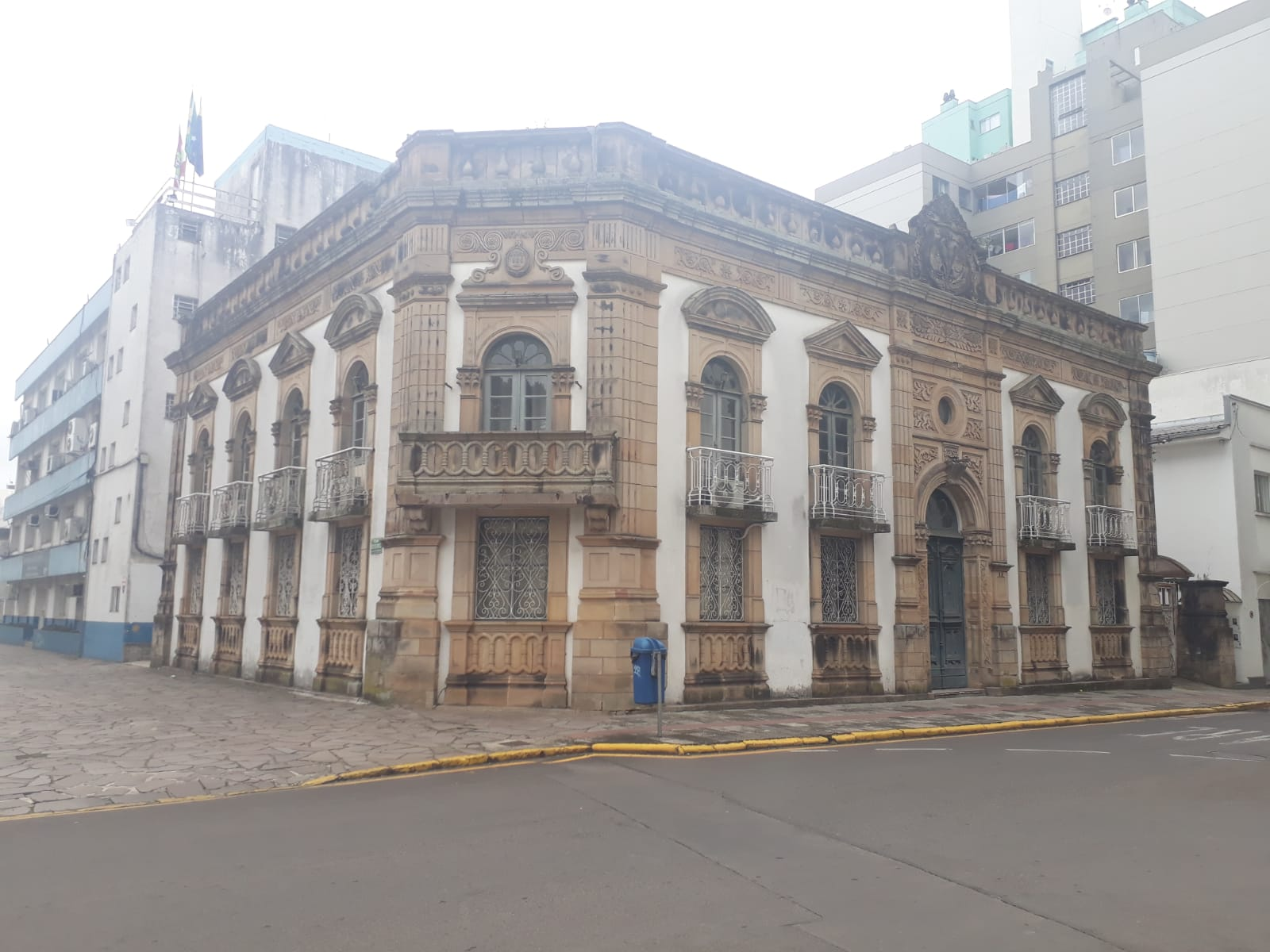
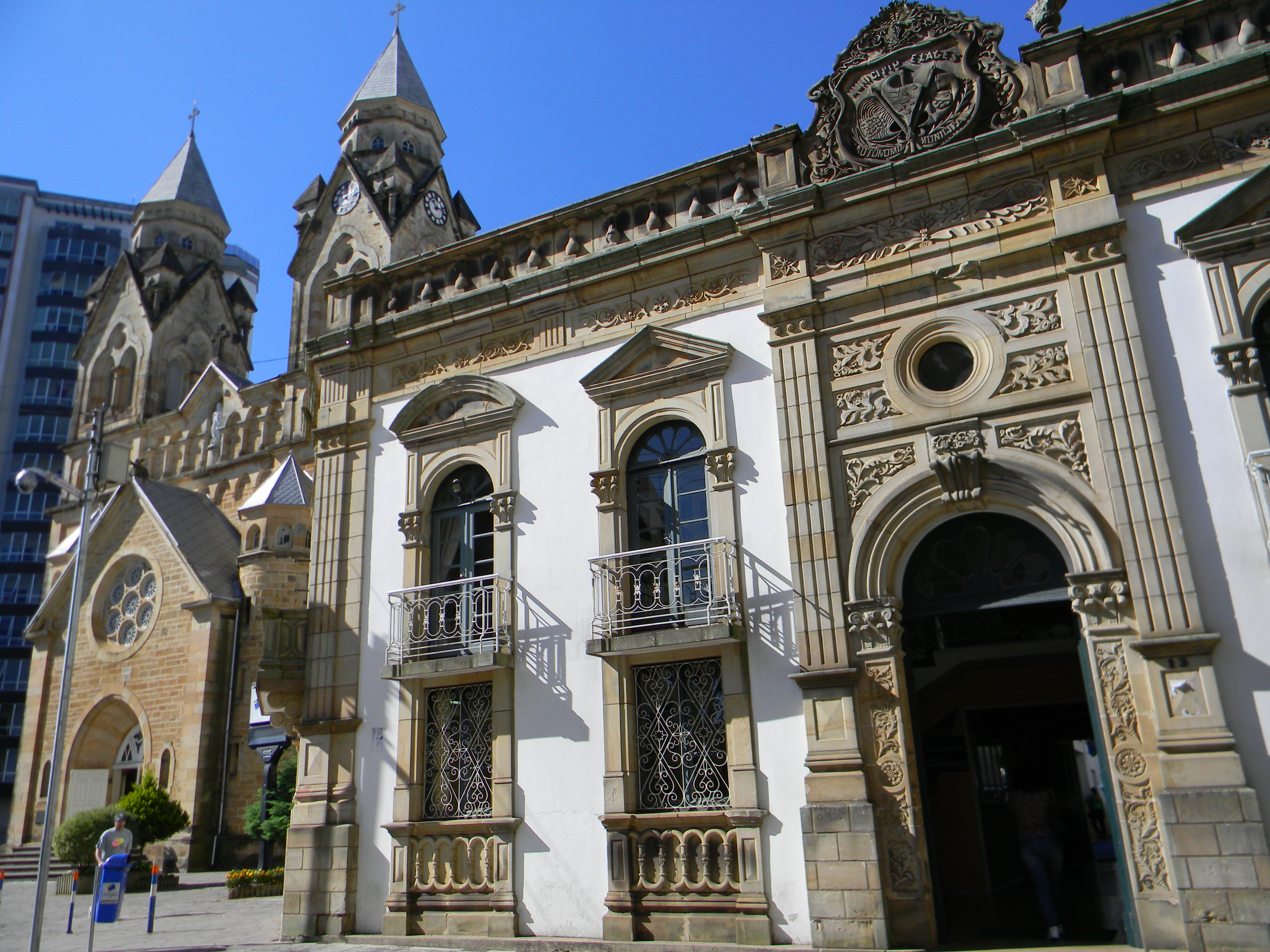
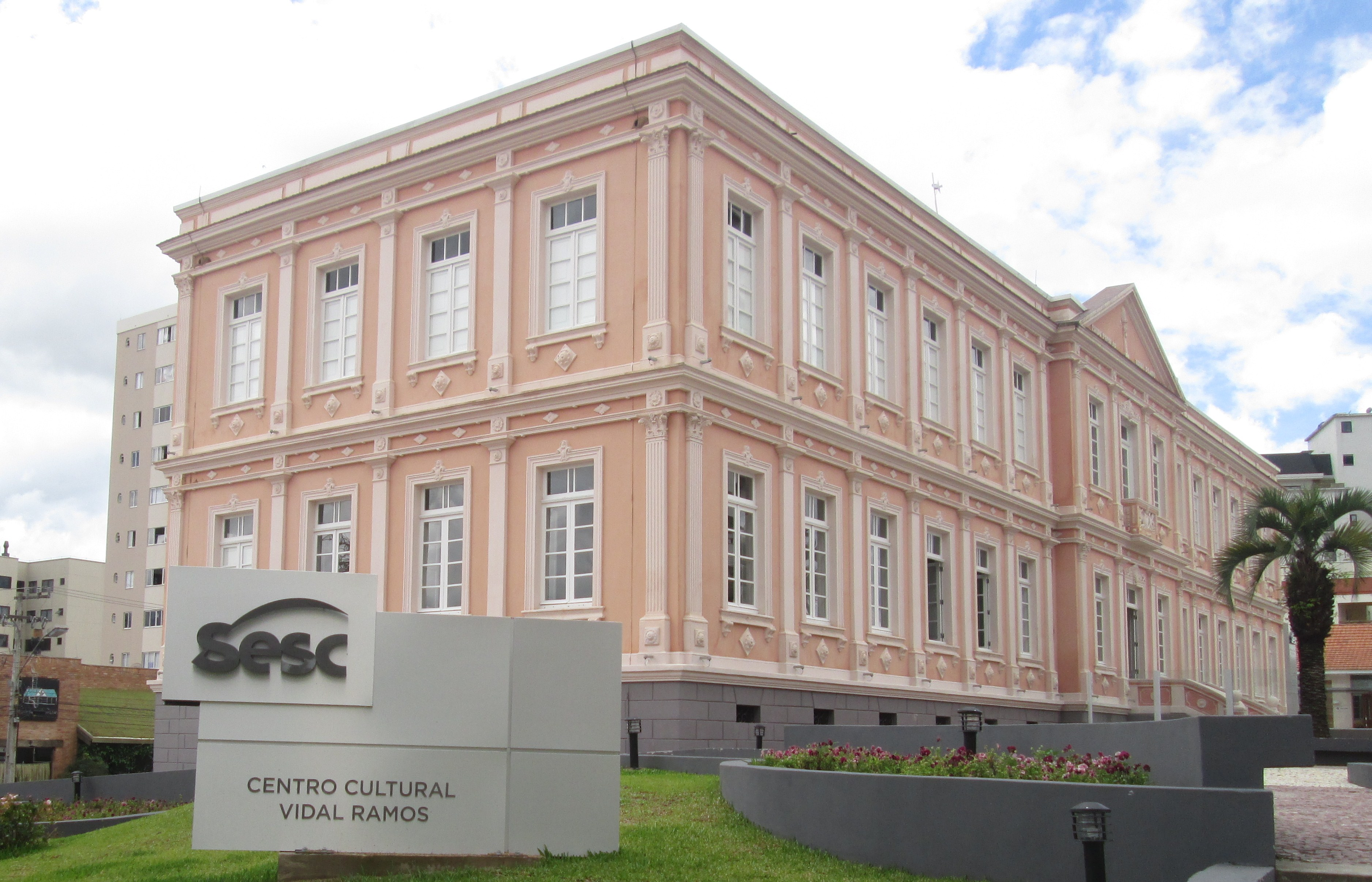
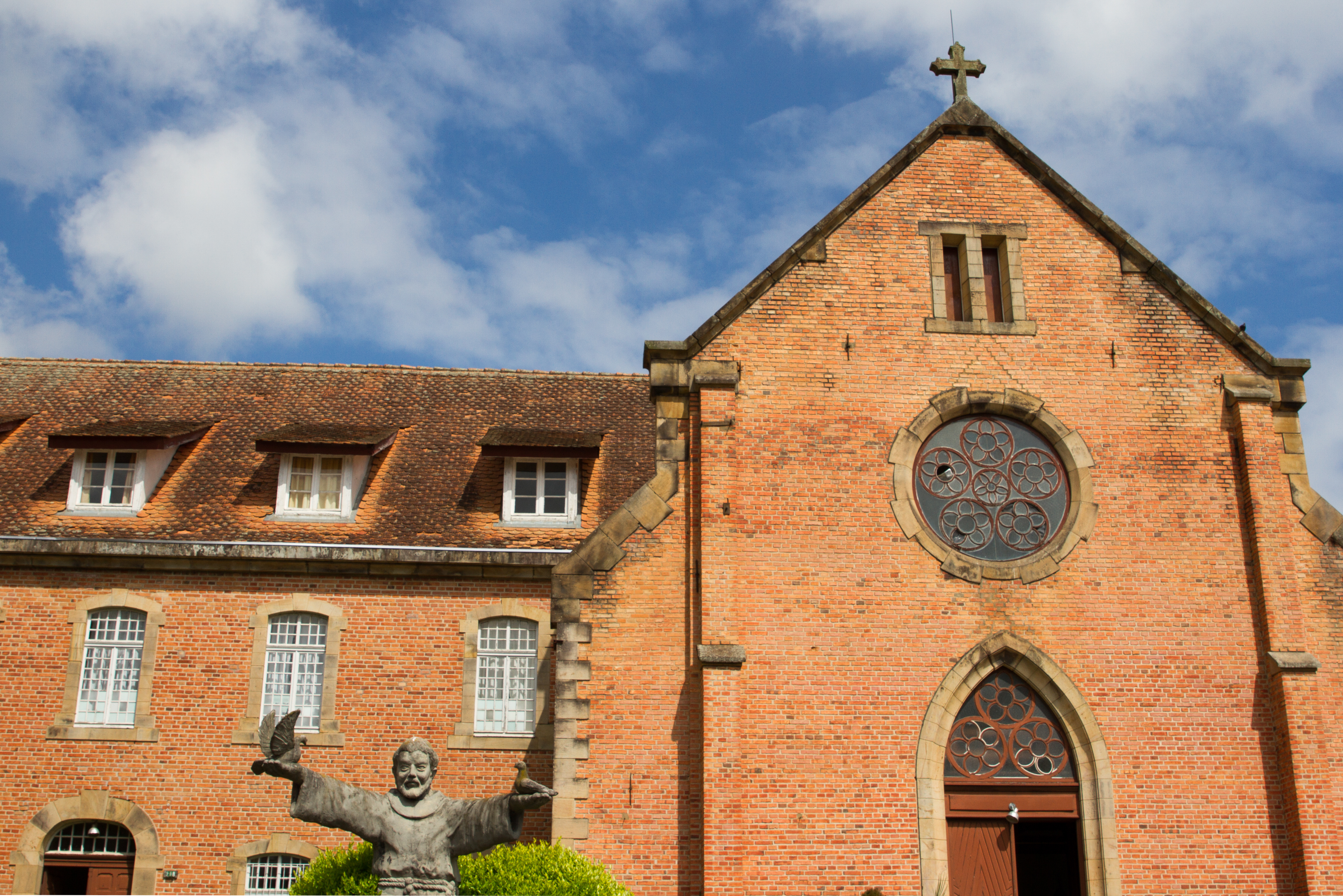

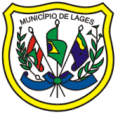
- Flag Coat of arms
- Nickname: Princesa da Serra (Princess of the Serra)
- Location in the state of Santa Catarina and Brazil
- Coordinates: 27°48′57″S 50°19′33″W
- Country: Brazil
- Region: South
- State: Santa Catarina
- Founded: November 22, 1776

Government
  - Mayor: Carmen Zanotto

Area
  - Total: 2,644.313 km^{2} (1,020.975 sq mi)
- Elevation: 916 m (3,005 ft)

Population (2022 Census)
  - Total: 164,981
  - Estimate (2025): 172,458
  - Density: 62.55/km^{2} (162.0/sq mi)
- Time zone: UTC-3 (UTC-3)
  - Summer (DST): UTC-2 (UTC-2)
- HDI (2010): 0.770 – high
- Website: www.lages.sc.gov.br

Lages is a Brazilian municipality located in the central part of the state of Santa Catarina, in the region known in Portuguese as "Planalto Serrano".

It is located in the mountain region of and is also the largest municipality of Santa Catarina. It is the main city of this region, and borders the towns of Otacílio Costa, São Joaquim, and Correia Pinto. The main course of urban water is Carahá River.

Lages hosts an annual festival called Festa do Pinhão, that is famous throughout the country.

Economically, the city is known for its strong cattle breeding and wood processing factories.

== History ==
In the beginning of the 17th century, the arrival of the first Europeans established the town. The growing of Lages was due to the opening of roads to reach the fields of Rio Grande do Sul. The people of São Paulo and Minas Gerais were attracted to this region due to the cattle-breeding business with the gauchos.

Very primitive documents mention Lages as a stop for horse riders that were traveling from Sorocaba or São Paulo, transporting mules, horses and cattle. Correia Pinto, the founder, was a horse rider, and ran cattle groups from Lages to São Paulo.

In 1766, Lages becomes a village. In 1820 it detached itself from São Paulo to be part of the state of Santa Catarina. On May 25, 1860, it was elevated to city status. In 1960, the city's current name was adopted.

During the Revolução Farroupilha, Lages belonged to the Juliana Republic.

Lages is served by Antônio Correia Pinto de Macedo Airport and Planalto Serrano Regional Airport located in the adjoining municipality of Correia Pinto.

== Geography ==
Lages is located in the mountain region of the state and is the largest municipality of it. It is the main city of this region, and borders the towns of Otacílio Costa, São Joaquim, and Correia Pinto. The main course of urban water is Carahá River.

=== Climate ===
Lages has a temperate oceanic climate (Koppen: Cfb), with an annual mean temperature of 16 °C (61 °F). Winter temperatures can stay below freezing, with occurrence of frost and snow. During the summer, temperatures may reach 30 °C (86 °F) and droughts may occur.

==== Records ====
Data by INMET shows that the lowest temperature recorded in the city between 1961 and 2017 was −6 °C (21 °F) on 14 July 2000 and the highest was 34.5 °C (94.1 °F) on 9 January 2006. On 1 October 2001, the city accumulated a record of 177 millimetres (7.0 in) of precipitation in a period of 24 hours. Previous large accumulations include 122 millimetres (4.8 in) on 22 October 1979 and 117.2 millimetres (4.61 in) on 16 April 1971.

With 671.4 millimetres (26.43 in), August 1983 was the month with the most accumulated precipitation. The lowest relative humidity observed was of 20% on 13 November 1971.

Climate data for Lages (1991–2020 normals, extremes 1961–2017)
Month	Jan	Feb	Mar	Apr	May	Jun	Jul	Aug	Sep	Oct	Nov	Dec	Year
Record high °C (°F)	34.5 (94.1)	34.3 (93.7)	33.2 (91.8)	30.8 (87.4)	27.9 (82.2)	25.6 (78.1)	26.9 (80.4)	31.0 (87.8)	32.4 (90.3)	32.6 (90.7)	34.4 (93.9)	33.9 (93.0)	34.5 (94.1)
Mean daily maximum °C (°F)	26.8 (80.2)	26.6 (79.9)	25.3 (77.5)	22.6 (72.7)	18.8 (65.8)	17.3 (63.1)	17.2 (63.0)	19.4 (66.9)	19.7 (67.5)	21.7 (71.1)	24.0 (75.2)	26.1 (79.0)	22.1 (71.8)
Daily mean °C (°F)	20.6 (69.1)	20.6 (69.1)	19.2 (66.6)	16.7 (62.1)	13.0 (55.4)	11.5 (52.7)	11.1 (52.0)	12.8 (55.0)	13.9 (57.0)	16.2 (61.2)	17.9 (64.2)	19.9 (67.8)	16.1 (61.0)
Mean daily minimum °C (°F)	16.3 (61.3)	16.4 (61.5)	15.2 (59.4)	12.7 (54.9)	9.1 (48.4)	7.6 (45.7)	7.0 (44.6)	8.1 (46.6)	9.8 (49.6)	12.2 (54.0)	13.4 (56.1)	15.3 (59.5)	11.9 (53.4)
Record low °C (°F)	5.4 (41.7)	7.0 (44.6)	2.3 (36.1)	−0.7 (30.7)	−3.4 (25.9)	−5.8 (21.6)	−6.0 (21.2)	−4.8 (23.4)	−4.0 (24.8)	0.2 (32.4)	2.9 (37.2)	3.2 (37.8)	−6.0 (21.2)
Average precipitation mm (inches)	177.6 (6.99)	167.0 (6.57)	126.6 (4.98)	115.1 (4.53)	120.7 (4.75)	126.7 (4.99)	159.3 (6.27)	125.6 (4.94)	175.0 (6.89)	201.4 (7.93)	138.1 (5.44)	149.1 (5.87)	1,782.2 (70.17)
Average precipitation days (≥ 1.0 mm)	13	12	10	8	8	8	9	8	10	12	10	11	119
Average relative humidity (%)	78.8	80.1	80.6	81.8	84.1	85.5	84.0	80.1	80.6	81.1	77.1	76.6	80.9
Mean monthly sunshine hours	199.8	173.8	181.2	158.9	145.4	128.6	145.5	166.8	141.6	150.4	195.7	195.1	1,982.8
Source: Instituto Nacional de Meteorologia Absolute temperature records: 1 January 1961 to 3 April 2017)

== Neighborhoods ==
Lages contains seventy-two neighborhoods:

- Araucária
- Área Industrial
- Bates
- Beatriz
- Bela Vista
- Bom Jesus
- Boqueirão
- Brusque
- Caça e Tiro
- Caravágio
- Caroba
- CDL
- Centenário
- Centro
- Cidade Alta
- Chapada
- Conta Dinheiro
- Copacabana
- Coral
- Conte
- Cruz de Malta
- Dom Daniel
- Ferrovia
- Frei Rogério
- Gethal
- Gralha Azul
- Guadalupe
- Guadalajara
- Guarujá
- Golin
- Habitação
- Ipiranga
- Jardim Celina
- Jardim das Camélias
- Jardim Panorâmico
- Maria Luiza
- Morro do Posto
- Morro Grande
- Nossa Senhora Aparecida
- Passo Fundo
- Penha
- Petrópolis
- Pisani
- Ponte Grande
  (Jardim Cepar)
  (Avenida Corina Caon)
- Popular
- Pró-Morar
- Restinga Seca
- Sagrado Coração de Jesus
- Santa Catarina
- Santa Cândida
- Santa Clara
- Santa Helena
- Santa Maria
- Santa Mônica
- Santa Rita
- Santo Antônio
- São Cristóvão
- São Francisco
- Salto Caveiras
- São Luiz
- São Miguel
- São Paulo
- São Pedro
- São Sebastião
- Triângulo
- Tributo
- Universitário
- Várzea
- Vila Comboni
- Vila Maria
- Vila Mariza
- Vila Nova
- Vista Alegre

== Gallery ==
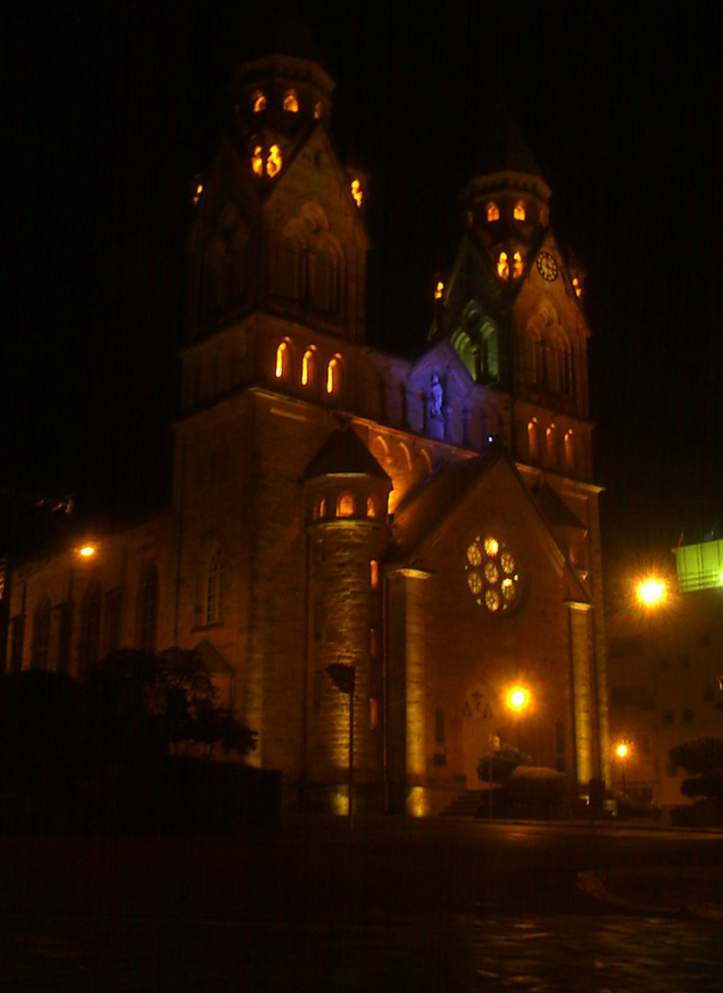
View of the Catedral Diocesana

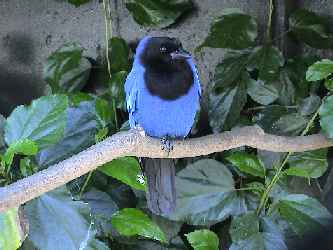
The azure jay (gralha azul) is the city bird
