= Diocese of Itapeva =

Catholic ecclesiastical territory

Coordinates: 23.9828°S 48.8757°W

Diocese of Itapeva Dioecesis Itapevensis

Catholic
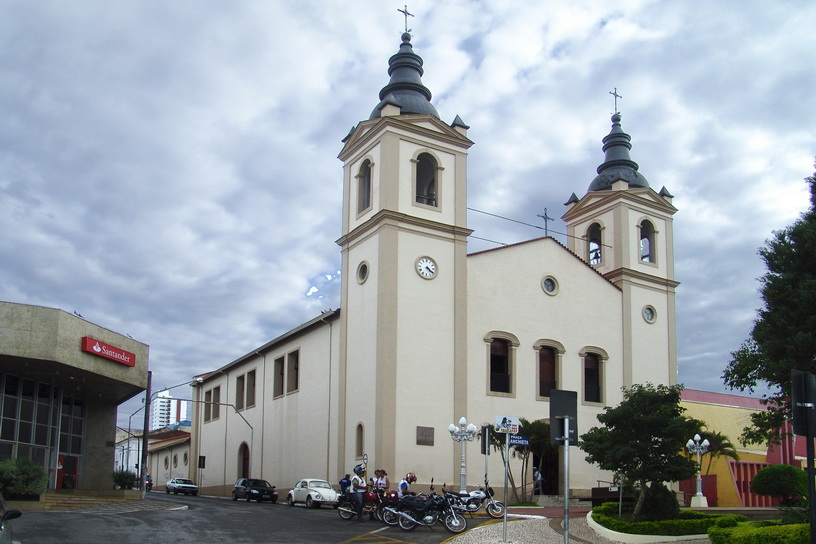
- Catedral Sant’Ana in 2008

Location
- Country: Brazil
- Ecclesiastical province: Sorocaba

Statistics
- Area: 14,182 km^{2} (5,476 sq mi)
- Population: Total; Catholics: (as of 2006); 401,000; 253,000 (63.1%)

Information
- Rite: Latin Rite
- Established: 2 March 1968 (58 years ago)
- Cathedral: Catedral Sant’Ana

Current leadership
- Pope: Leo XIV
- Bishop: Eduardo Malaspina
- Metropolitan Archbishop: Sede vacante

The Roman Catholic Diocese of Itapeva (Latin: Dioecesis Itapevensis) is a diocese located in the city of Itapeva in the ecclesiastical province of Sorocaba in Brazil.

== History ==
- 2 March 1968: Established as Diocese of Itapeva from the Metropolitan Archdiocese of Botucatu, Diocese of Sorocaba and Diocese of Santos

== Bishops ==
- Bishops of Itapeva (Roman rite), in reverse chronological order
  - Bishop Arnaldo Carvalheiro Neto (2016.10.19 – 2022.06.15) appointed Bishop of Jundiaí, Sao Paulo
  - Bishop José Moreira de Melo (1996.01.17 – 2016.10.19)
  - Bishop Alano Maria Pena, O.P. (later Archbishop) (1985.07.11 – 1993.11.24), appointed Bishop of Nova Friburgo, Rio de Janeiro
  - Bishop Fernando Legal, S.D.B. (1980.03.28 – 1985.04.25), appointed Bishop of Limeira, São Paulo
  - Bishop José Lambert Filho, C.S.S. (1975.01.04 – 1979.11.30), appointed Coadjutor Bishop of Sorocaba; future Archbishop
  - Bishop Silvio Maria Dário (1968.03.27 – 1974.05.02)

=== Coadjutor bishop ===
- Arnaldo Carvalheiro Neto (2016)
