= Santana de Parnaíba =

- Municipality
- Municipality of Santana de Parnaíba
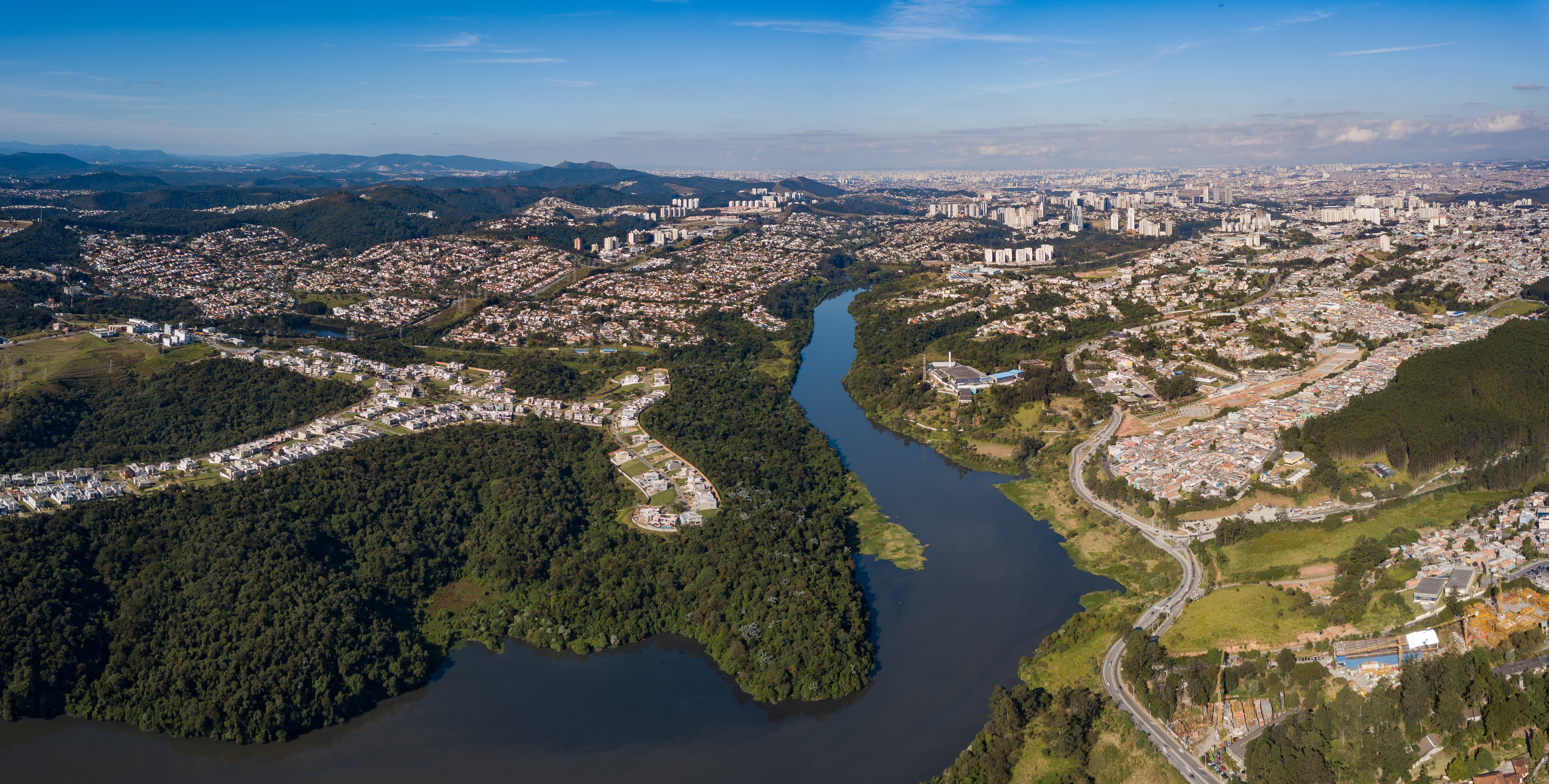
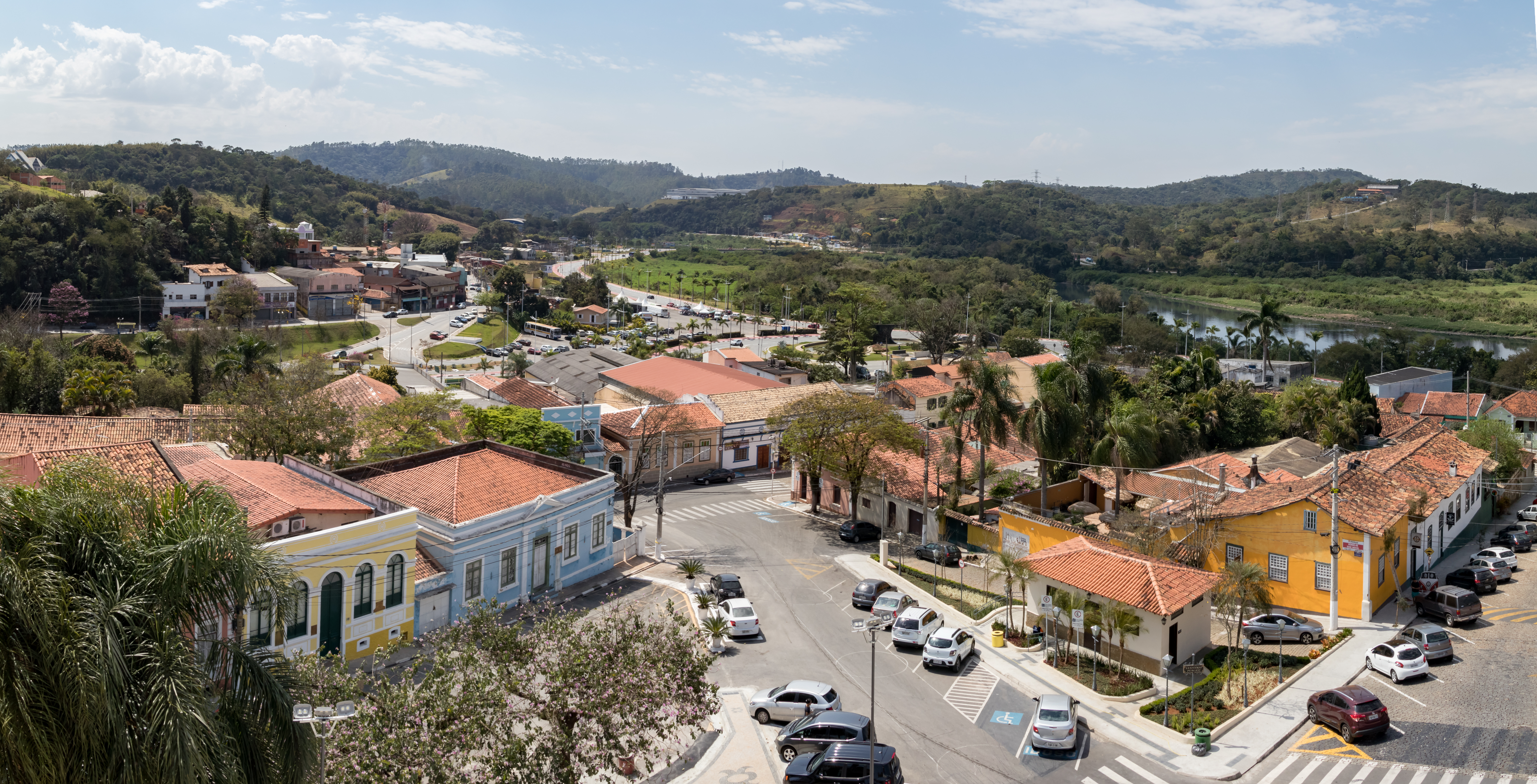
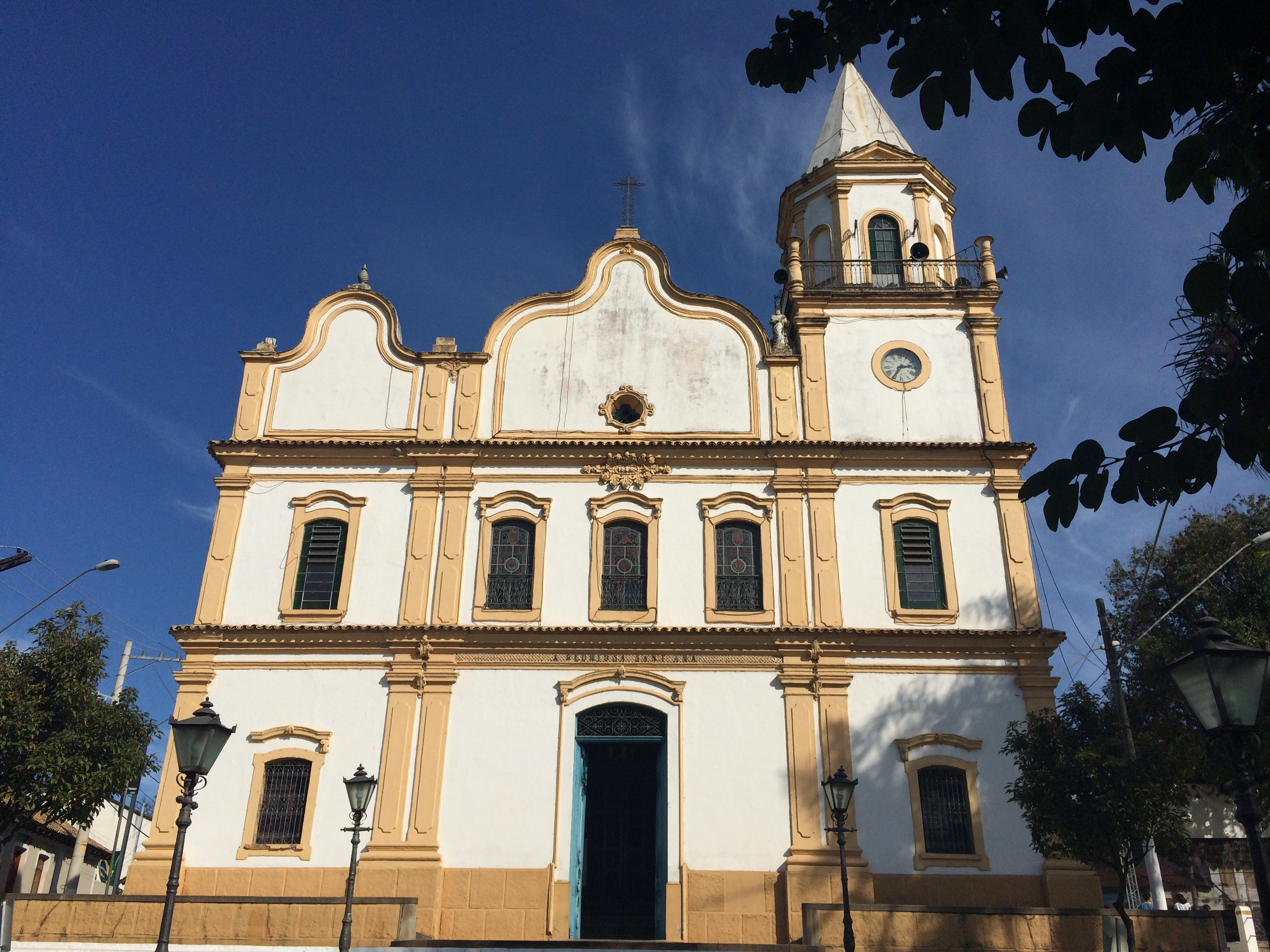
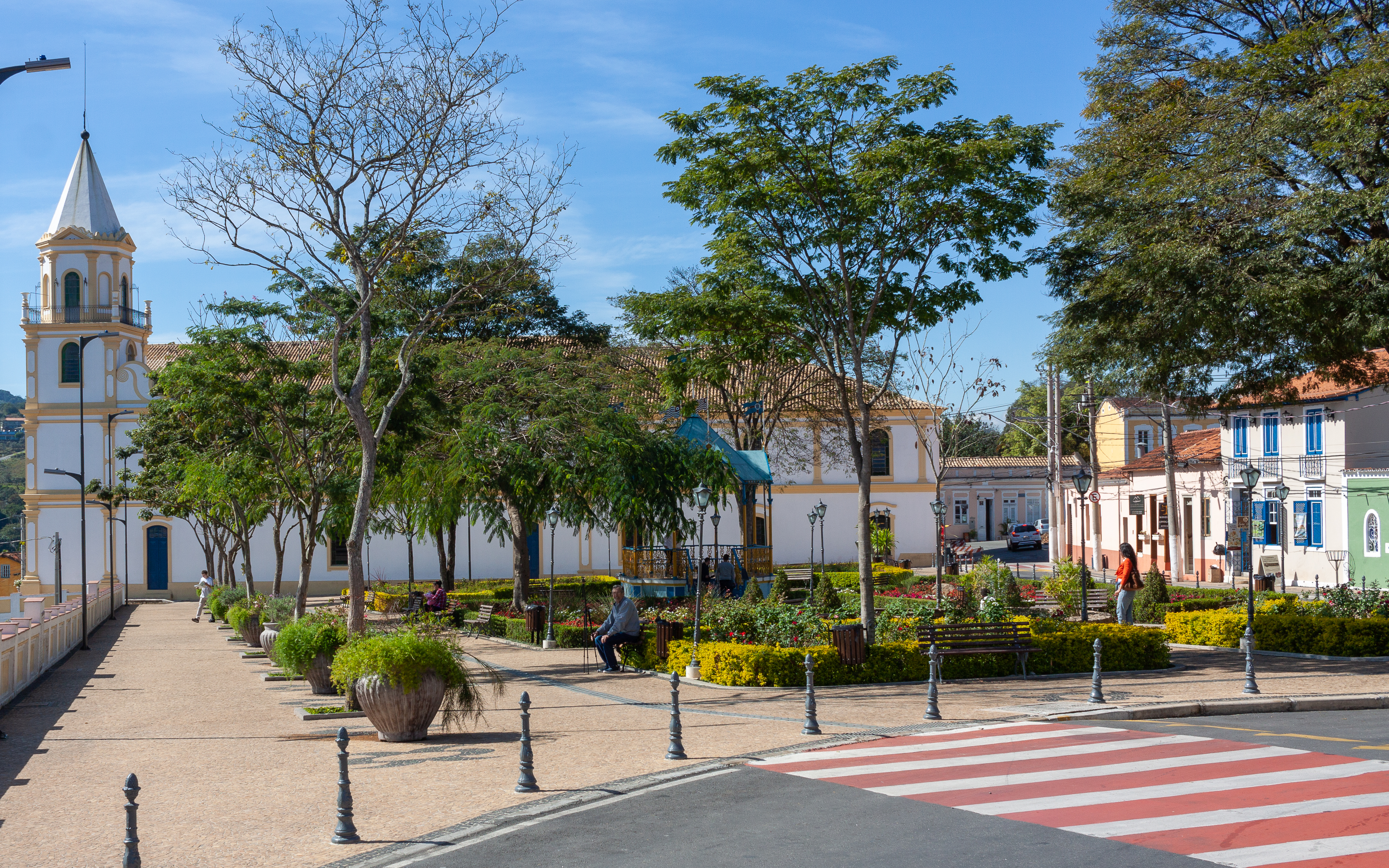
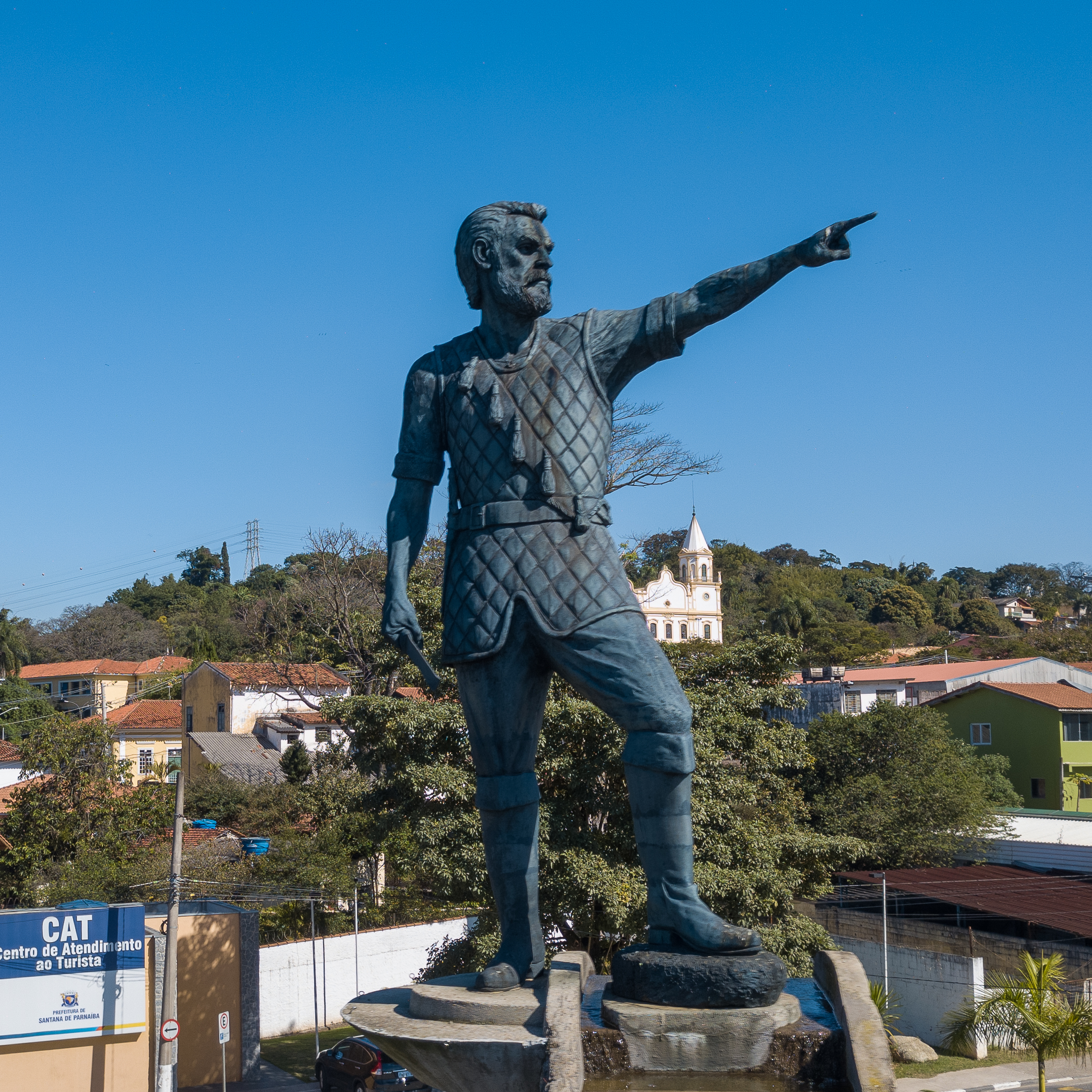
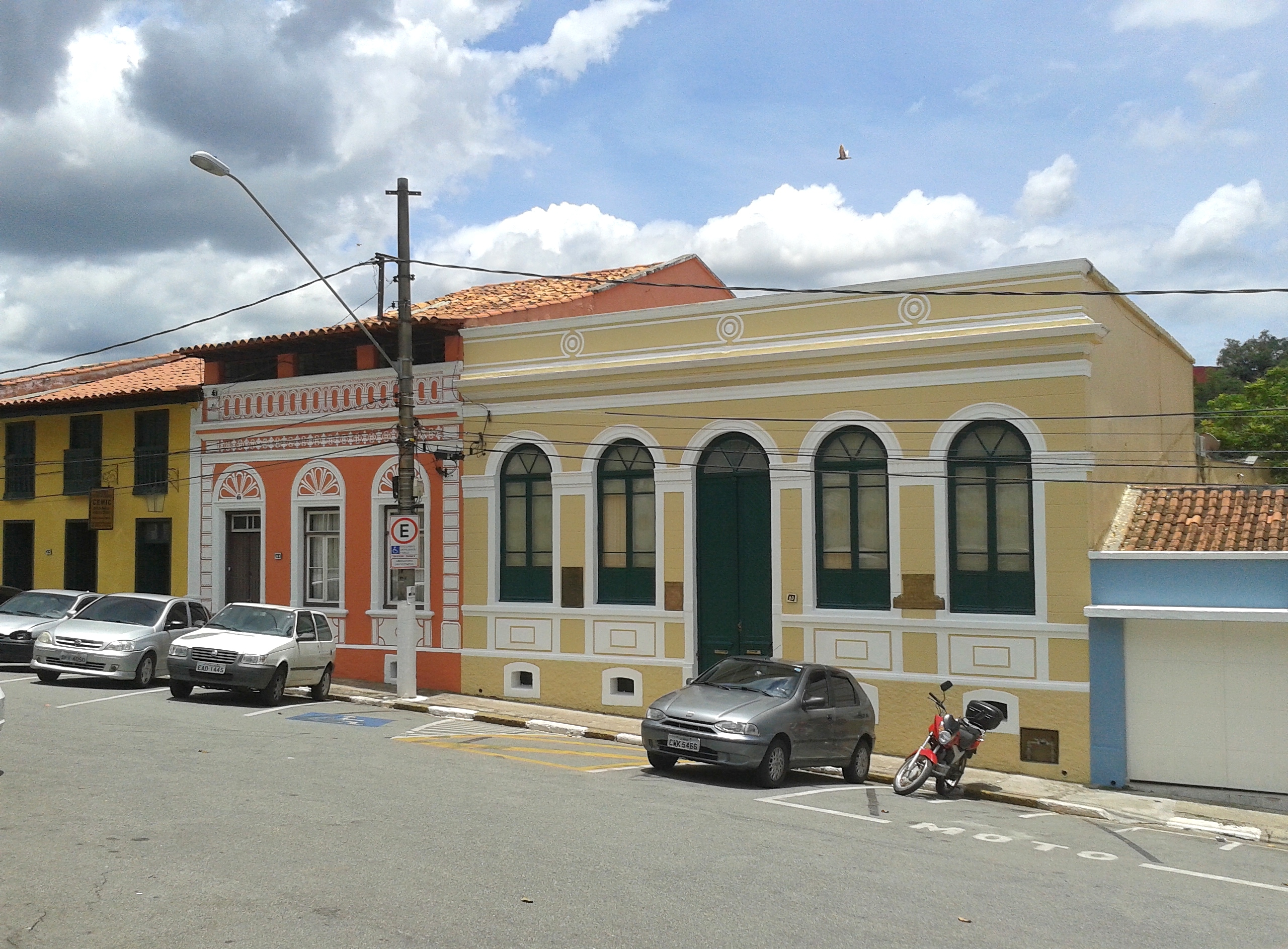
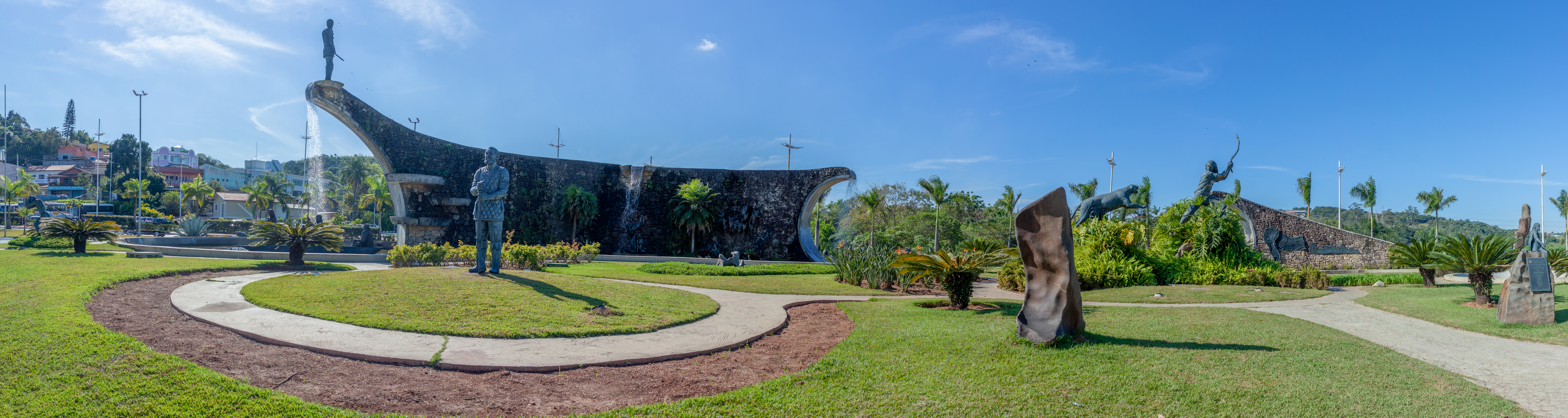
- Church in Santana de Parnaíba

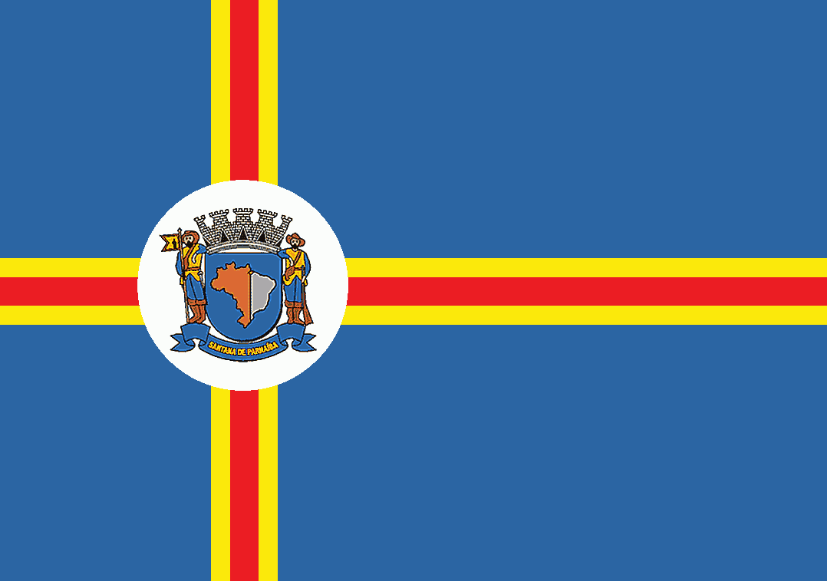
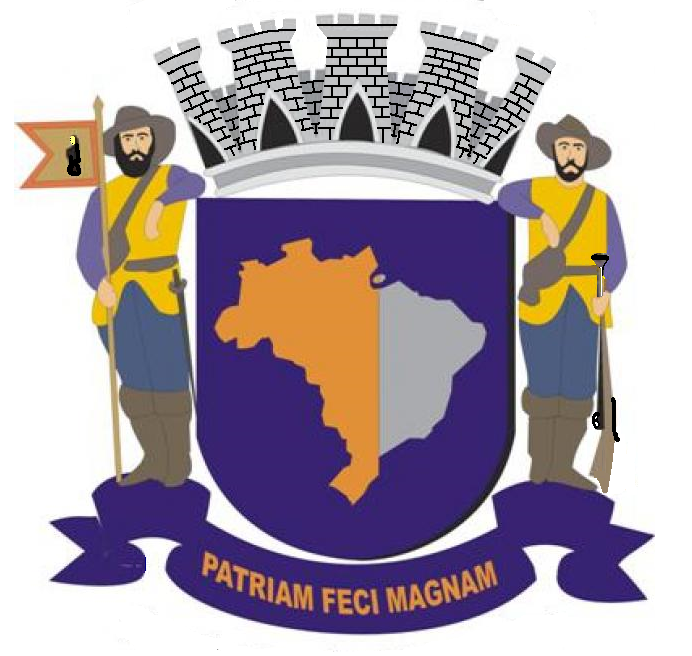
- Flag Coat of arms

- Location in São Paulo state

- Location in Brazil
- Coordinates: 23°26′38″S 46°55′4″W
- Country: Brazil
- Region: Southeast Brazil
- State: São Paulo
- Metropolitan Region: São Paulo

Area
  - Total: 179.95 km^{2} (69.48 sq mi)

Population (2022 Census)
  - Total: 154,105
  - Estimate (2025): 163,787
  - Density: 856.38/km^{2} (2,218.0/sq mi)
- Time zone: UTC−3 (BRT)
- HDI (2010): 0.814 – very high

Santana de Parnaíba is a city and municipality in the state of São Paulo in Brazil. It is part of the Metropolitan Region of São Paulo. The population is 154,105 (2022 Census) in an area of 179.95 km^{2} (69.48 sq mi). It was founded in 1625 near the Tietê River by Susana Dias, an important Bandeirante (Brazilian pioneers) wife. It was the birthplace of prominent Bandeirante Domingos Jorge Velho, and of Warwick Estevam Kerr.

The word Parnaíba means rocky river.

The municipality contains and administers the 367-hectare (910-acre) Tamboré Biological Reserve, a strictly protected conservation unit.

== Notable people ==
- Warwick Estevam Kerr (1922–2018), agricultural engineer and biologist, was born in Santana de Parnaíba.

== Media ==
In telecommunications, the city was served by Companhia Telefônica Brasileira until 1973, when it began to be served by Telecomunicações de São Paulo. In July 1998, this company was acquired by Telefónica, which adopted the Vivo brand in 2012.

The company is currently an operator of cell phones, fixed lines, internet (fiber optics/4G) and television (satellite and cable).

== See also ==
- List of municipalities in São Paulo
