= History of São Paulo =

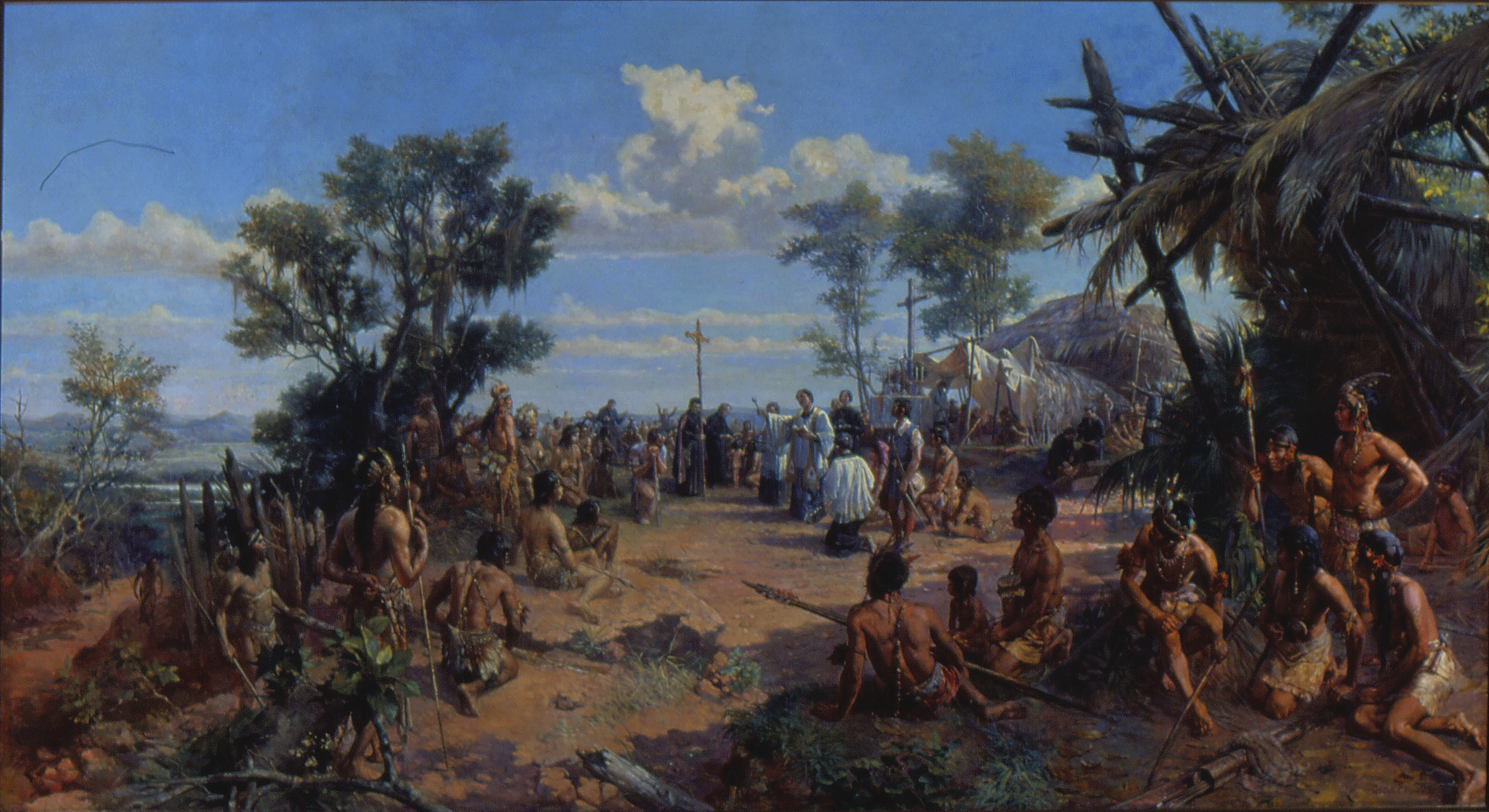
Founding of São Paulo, 1909 painting by Oscar Pereira da Silva

The history of the city of São Paulo runs parallel to the history of Brazil, throughout approximately 470 years of its existence, in relation to the country's more than five hundred years. During the first three centuries since its foundation, São Paulo stood out in several moments as the scenario of important events of rupture in the country's history.

São Paulo emerged as a Jesuit mission, on January 25, 1554, gathering in its first territories inhabitants of both European and indigenous origin. Over time, the settlement became a commercial and service center of relative regional importance. This characteristic of a commercial city with a heterogeneous composition would accompany the city throughout its history, and would reach its apex after the vast demographic and economic growth resulting from the coffee cycle and industrialization that would raise São Paulo to the position of largest city in the country.

== Pre-Colonial period ==
The oldest carbon-14 data obtained to date suggest that the first human groups settled in the current state of São Paulo in the early millennia of the Holocene, between 11,000 and 9,000 years ago. This initial occupation was by nomadic indigenous peoples living in small camps, with a hunting economy that required a diversity of stone tools produced by lithic reduction, as well as instruments made from organic raw materials (such as bone and wood). Among the tools stand out the large unifacial scrapers, widely used for animal shedding activities, as well as arrows and hammerstones. At first, as a way to facilitate the understanding of the occupation processes of the region, archaeological research focused on the context of the São Paulo territory associated with these populations to two distinct archaeological traditions: Umbu and Humaitá.

The oldest archaeological records ever discovered in the municipality of São Paulo were collected at the Morumbi site, presenting an estimated dating of 5 500 years BP. Found by chance in 1964, more than 200 000 stone tools were identified at the Morumbi site over four stages of excavation, which would reinforce the hypothesis that it was an area for obtaining raw materials for stone tool production. In 2002, during the Rodoanel construction work, another archaeological site with a large number of hammerstone fragments was found, which was named Jaraguá 2.

The archaeological records concerning horticultural and pottery populations are more recent in and around São Paulo, likely dating back to the first centuries of the Christian era. By dominating the agriculture of carbohydrate-rich crops such as maize and cassava, such groups presented a higher demographic density, being the ancestors of the populations speaking languages related to the Macro- Jê and Tupi branches. Although they also produced tools from rocks and other materials, the archaeological remains for which they are best known are ceramics. This is the case at the Jaraguá 1, Jardim Princesa 1, Jardim Princesa 2 and Penha sites, places where the pottery found has been associated with the Tupiguarani Tradition. Other archaeological sites where indigenous ceramic material was found, but without association with known archaeological traditions, are Olaria II, Jaraguá Clube, and Paulistão. There is also abundant evidence for the presence of Jê ceramic populations, generally associated by the archaeological literature with the Itararé-Taquara Tradition.

During the 19th century, several historical researches concluded, based on documents from the colonial period, that the lands of the Plains of Piratininga were inhabited by the Guaianás (also known as Guaianazes). Although it is now known that these groups were related to the Macro-Jê linguistic branch, possibly ancestors of the current Kaingang, they were often associated with the Tupi-Guaraní-speaking peoples by the eighteenth-century São Paulo historiography. According to Monteiro:

...the 'historical tradition' originated with Gabriel Soares de Sousa in the 16th century, who vaguely attributed to the Guaianá a territory that extended from Angra dos Reis to Cananeia. This tradition was vulgarized by Pedro Taques, Frei Gaspar, Machado de Oliveira, Varnhagen, Azevedo Marques, and Couto de Magalhães, among others, who confused Soares de Sousa's Guaianá with the Tupi from other cohesive sources (Ribeiro, 1908, 183). At that point, however, Teodoro Sampaio had already solved the riddle: based on a careful study of the 16th century writers, the Bahian Tupinologist concluded that the Guaianá were indeed a non-Tupi group but were not the main inhabitants of the areas later colonized by the Portuguese (Sampaio, 1897 and 1903).

On the other hand, archaeological and historiographical data from the 17th and 18th centuries have shown that the Guaianá were numerous in the village of São Paulo at that time, as they were captured by the bandeirantes expeditions to serve as slaves in the plantations. The term "Guaianá", however, does not necessarily describe a specific people, but several non-Guaraní populations, and is not a term used by the Indians themselves. According to the accounts left by the Jesuits in the 16th century, the so-called Piratininga plateau was inhabited predominantly by Tupi groups upon the arrival of the Europeans, with the Tupiniquins often being mentioned.

== Colonial period ==
=== Precedents ===
In 1532, Martim Afonso de Sousa founded the first Brazilian village of São Vicente on the coast of São Paulo. There, the first conflict between Europeans in South America took place, the Iguape War. Donatário of the Captaincy of São Vicente, Martim Afonso encouraged the occupation of the region, and other villages were created on the coast (Itanhaém, 1532; Santos, 1546). A few years later, after overcoming the barrier represented by the Serra do Mar, the Portuguese colonizers advanced through the Paulistan plateau, establishing new settlements. In 1553, João Ramalho, who had lived on the plateau since before the creation of São Vicente, founded the village of Santo André da Borda do Campo, located on the way to the sea (today in the metropolitan region of São Paulo). João Ramalho was married to Bartira, an Indian who was the daughter of Tibiriçá, the Tupiniquim cacique.

=== Foundation ===
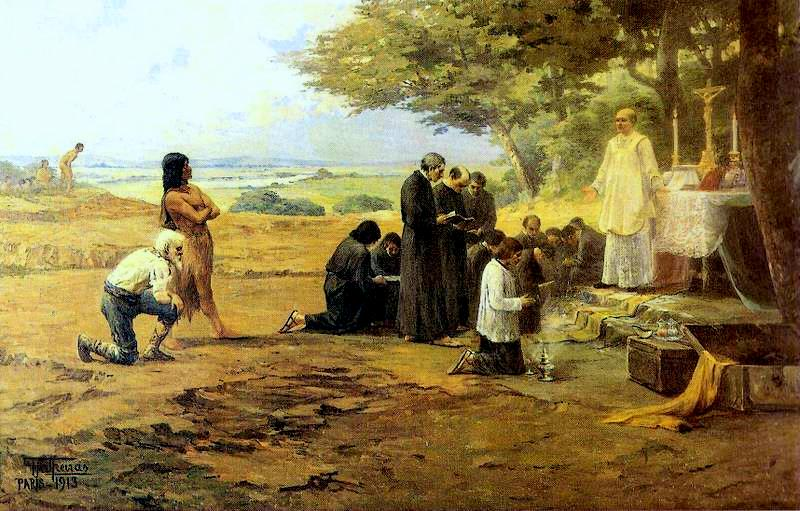
Foundation of São Paulo ("Fundação de São Paulo"), 1913. Painting by Antônio Parreiras.

Interested in establishing a place where he could catechize the natives away from the influence of white men, Father Manuel da Nóbrega, superior of the Society of Jesus in Brazil, observed that a nearby region located on a plateau would be the ideal point, then called Piratininga. On August 29, 1553, Father Nóbrega made 50 catechumens among the natives, which increased the desire to found a Jesuit college in Brazil.

Although the quest for catechesis without the influence of the white man was a goal, what precipitated the move to the plateau was the need to solve the problem of feeding the indigenous people who were being indoctrinated, as Father Anchieta states:

For the sustenance of these children, manioc flour was brought from the countryside, from a distance of 30 miles. As it was very laborious and difficult, because of the roughness of the road, it seemed best to our Father (Manuel da Nóbrega) to move to this Indian settlement, which is called Piratininga.

In January 1554, a group of Jesuits, commanded by priest Manuel da Nóbrega, assisted by the Jesuit priest Joseph of Anchieta and João Ramalho arrived at the plateau. Intending to catechize the indigenous people living in the region, the Jesuits erected a mud hut on a high and flat hill, located between the Tietê, Anhangabaú, and Tamanduateí rivers, with the consent of local indigenous chiefs, such as the cacique Tibiriçá, who commanded a nearby Tupiniquim village, and cacique Tamandiba. On January 25, the day that commemorates the conversion of the apostle Paul, Father Manuel de Paiva celebrated the first mass on the hill. The celebration marked the beginning of the installation of the Jesuits at the site and went down in history as the birth of the city of São Paulo. Two years later, the priests erected a church - the first lasting building in the settlement. Next, they built a school and a pavilion with living quarters. Of these original buildings, only one mud wall remains, where the Pátio do Colégio is today.

Around the school, a small settlement of converted natives, Jesuits, and Portuguese colonizers was formed. In 1560, the population of the village would be significantly increased, when, by order of Mem de Sá, general governor of the colony, the inhabitants of the village of Santo André da Borda do Campo were transferred to the vicinity of the college. The village of Santo André was extinguished, and the settlement was elevated to this category, with the name "Vila de São Paulo de Piratininga". By royal act, in the same year, the town council, then called "Casa do Conselho", was created. It was likely in the same year of 1560 that the Confraternity of Mercy of São Paulo (now "Santa Casa de Misericórdia") was created.

In 1562, troubled by the alliance between the Tupiniquim and the Portuguese, the Tupinambás, united in the Confederação dos Tamoios, launched a series of attacks against the village on July 9, in the episode known as Cerco de Piratininga. The defense organized by Tibiriçá and João Ramalho prevented the Tupinambás from entering São Paulo, and forced them to retreat, on July 10 of the same year.

Still in 1590, with the imminence of a new attack, the city again prepared itself with defense works. But at the turn of the 17th century, the situation calmed down and the settlement was consolidated. In the words of Alcantara Machado:

After all, with the retreat, the submission, and the extermination of the neighboring gentile, the condition of the Paulistanos became more relaxed and the regular use of the land began. From this, and only from this, can the settlers derive sustenance and cabedais [material goods]. The capital with which they start life is null, or almost null. Among them, there are no representatives of the great peninsular houses [families of the kingdom], nor of the moneyed bourgeoisie. Some of them indeed resemble the small nobility of the kingdom. But, if they emigrate to such a harsh and distant province, it is precisely because they suffered bad luck in their native land. Others, the vast majority, are countrymen, merchants with limited resources, and adventurous craftsmen of all kinds, seduced by the promises of the donatário or by the possibilities that the new continent offers them.

=== City occupation ===
Since the beginning, the occupation of the city's land was polycentric, with several villages, mainly Jesuit, but also from other ecclesiastical orders, around which the agglomerations began. The main motivation in São Paulo for this was the relief of the city, with many slopes and streams. The urban organization, as in the whole colony, was centered, administratively and ecclesiastically, in parishes. Each parish was centered on a chapel.

The first parish was the Freguesia da Sé, founded in 1589. As the other centers grew, they dismembered, with new chapels gaining parish status. The parishes dismembered from the center were:

- 1796, March 26: Parishes of Nossa Senhora do Ó and Penha de França.
- 1809, April 21: Santa Ifigênia parish, close but separated by the Anhangabaú river.
- 1812, October 21: Parish of São Bernardo, which the following year (1813, November 9) was still elevated to district.
- 1818, June 8: Parish of Brás, close, but separated by the Tamanduateí river.

Besides these, there were several more distant villages. Among them, only two prospered: Pinheiros and São Miguel, both founded by José de Anchieta in 1560. Inaugurated in 1580 and later rebuilt in 1622, the chapel erected by the Jesuits in the current neighborhood of São Miguel Paulista is considered the oldest in the municipality of São Paulo. Several villages were decimated by smallpox, among which can be mentioned: Itaquaquecetuba, Mboy, Itapecerica, Barueri, Guarapiranga, Carapicuíba, Ibirapuera and Guarulhos.

Also in the 16th century, new churches were founded: the Mother Church, in 1588 (the prototype of the São Paulo cathedral), Nossa Senhora do Carmo Church, in 1592 (demolished in 1928), Santo Antônio Church (currently in Patriarca Square), and Nossa Senhora da Assunção Chapel, around 1600 (which would give rise to the current São Bento Monastery). A traveler arriving in the city in the first decades of the 19th century would encounter the following:

After passing the Church of Penha on its small hill, one would see, in the distance, the entire site of the city. Standing on another hill, São Paulo would appear dominated by the towers of its eight churches, its two convents, and its three monasteries. It was still necessary to walk almost nine kilometers, cross the small settlement formed around the Brás Church, passes the swampy Carmo, and cross the point over the Tamanduateí Creek to finally reach the urban center.

The basis of food in the early days was formed by canjica, one of the main indigenous influences in colonial cuisine, the angu (a type of porridge made with cornmeal, maize, or cassava flour). Cassava, which was the main food at the beginning of the village, was slowly being supplanted by corn. Wheat, although growing in the region, was not very used in the beginning - only for sacramental bread and cookies - due to the ease of obtaining cassava and corn. It was only in the early years of the 17th century that greater wheat production began, with at least fifty wheat planters on the plateau and several licenses from the Chamber for residents to build their mills.

Besides these staple foods, wild fruits, palm hearts and other foods found on Amerindian plantations were part of the diet, as well as many European fruits such as apples, peaches, blackberries, melons, and watermelons. The culture of grape also developed in the early years. Wine was plentiful and often used as medicine, serving as vehicles for medicinal plants. The same was true for the cachaça produced in the region.

=== The bandeirantes ===
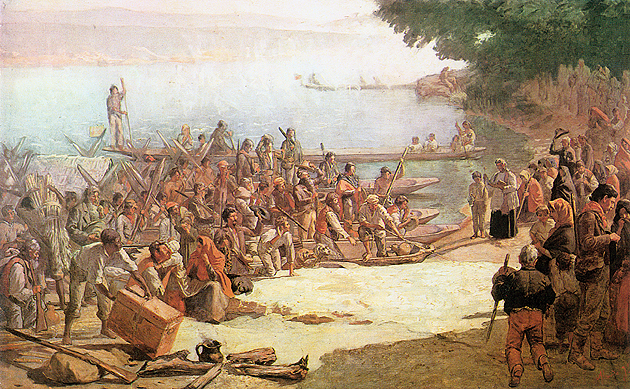
Study of the Monsoon Departure ("Estudo da Partida da Monção"), 1897. Painting by Almeida Júnior.

In the 17th century, the economic activities of the village were limited almost exclusively to subsistence agriculture. The production and export of sugar were not very developed, although other crops grew on the outskirts of the village, such as wheat, manioc, and corn, as well as cattle breeding. Nevertheless, São Paulo remained a poor settlement center, isolated from the most dynamic areas of the colony. Thus, already in the first decades of the century, the Paulistans started to organize the bandeiras - large expeditions that went to the unexplored backlands of the colony - in search of Indian labor, stones, and precious metals. In a short time, the bandeirantes became largely responsible for expanding the limits of the colony's frontiers, incorporating into Brazilian territory countless areas that, according to the Treaty of Tordesillas, belonged to Spain.

Bandeirantes became central actors in São Paulo's political history in the 17th century, and the explorers' local authority sometimes overrode the interests of the Catholic Church and the Portuguese crown itself. In 1640, the Jesuits' strong opposition to the bandeirantes' capture and commercialization of Indian labor led to a series of conflicts between the two groups, which culminated, on July 13 of that year, with the expulsion of the Jesuits from São Paulo, a measure supported by the town's merchants. The Jesuits would only obtain permission to return to São Paulo in 1653.

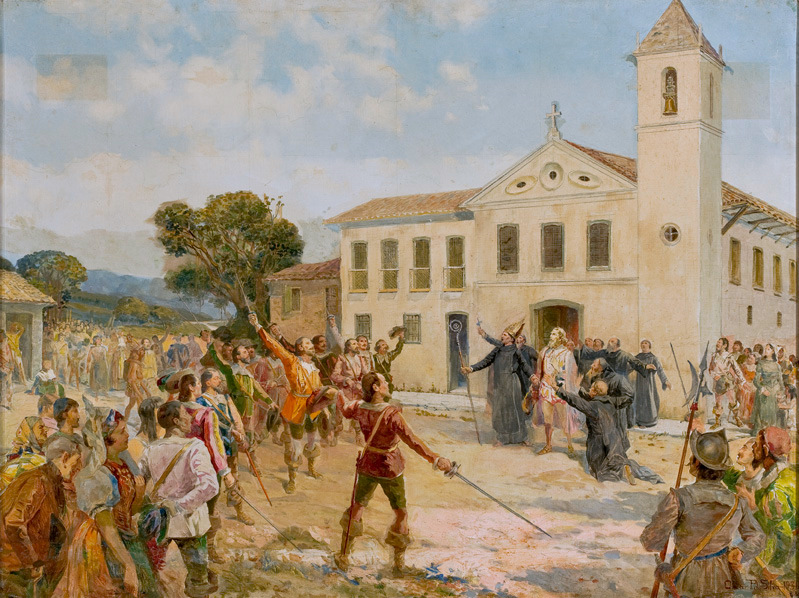
Amador Bueno's acclamation ("Aclamação de Amador Bueno"), 1909. Painting by Oscar Pereira da Silva.

It is also in the village of São Paulo that the first nativist movement in Brazil was registered, still in 1640, the so-called "Aclamation of Amador Bueno". With the end of the Restoration War, in which Portugal re-established its political independence from Spain, the inhabitants of São Paulo, mainly bandeirantes and merchants, feared they would be harmed since they had benefited economically from the traffic of indigenous people in the region of the Río de la Plata during the decades of the Iberian Union. In protest, they declared São Paulo an independent kingdom, and Amador Bueno, Captain Major, a wealthy inhabitant of the town and brother of the bandeirante Francisco Bueno, was acclaimed king. Amador Bueno, however, rejects the title and swears allegiance to the Portuguese crown, ending the uprising.

At the first moment, the concentration of the bandeirantes' activity in São Paulo promoted, even if timidly, the economic activity of the village, that for the first time tried to exercise the position of a commercial warehouse. Some bandeirantes, enriched by trading Indian slaves, made improvements in the village. Fernão Dias, elected ordinary judge, and mayor, for instance, donated to the Benedictine monks the resources necessary to rebuild the São Bento Monastery. Other religious orders would settle in the city in the 17th century, such as the Franciscans, who in 1647 had inaugurated the convent (demolished in 1932, to make way for the Law School) and the church of São Francisco, in the homonymous square.

Although most of the buildings built during the colonial period were demolished in the following centuries, some of the farmhouses erected between the 17th and 18th centuries can still be seen in São Paulo. This is the case at the archaeological sites Casa do Tatuapé, Casa do Itaim, Casa do Bandeirante, Casa do Sertanista, Morrinhos, Sítio da Ressaca, Sítio do Capão and Casa do Sítio Mirim, sites conventionally called bandeirista houses. Other sites where there are material traces of the former village of São Paulo de Piratininga and surrounding villages are the archaeological sites Guaianazes, Pinheiros 2, Santo Amaro 01, Travessa da Sé, Horácio Lafer and Poço Jesuíta.

=== The Gold Rush ===
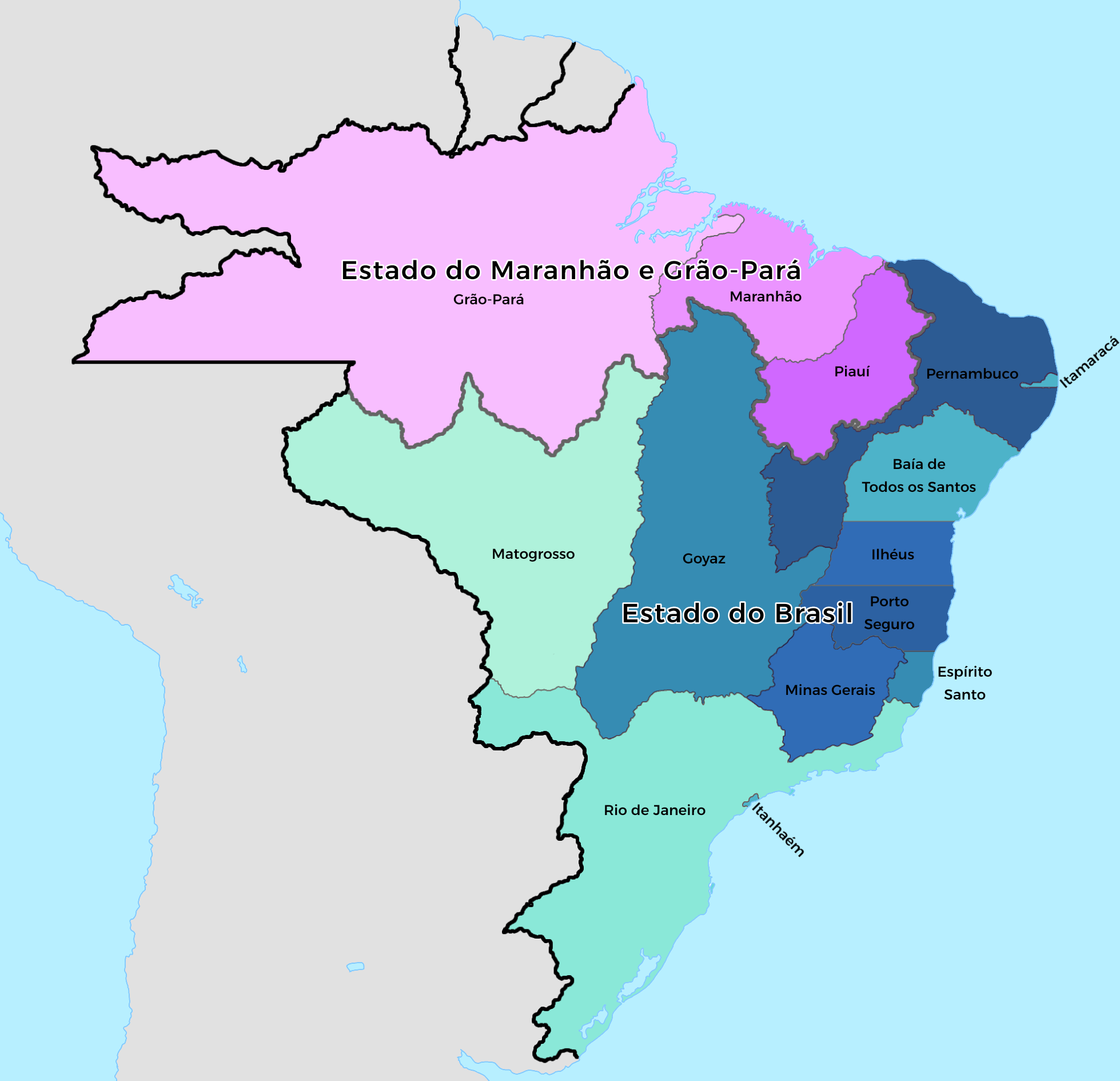
Administrative division of Brazil after the War of the Emboabas

Strategically located in front of the main roads to the countryside, and bathed by the Tietê river (whose natural course served as a road to the countryside of the captaincy and the current Midwest region), São Paulo became the main center of the bandeirante movement, especially after the 1660s. It was from the town that the historical expeditions of Fernão Dias Pais, Antônio Raposo Tavares, Domingos Jorge Velho, and Bartolomeu Bueno da Silva started.

In 1690, the bandeirantes from São Paulo discovered gold in the "Sertão do Cuieté", in the present-day state of Minas Gerais. They would repeat the feat a few years later, in Mato Grosso and Goiás. By the end of the 16th century, however, gold mining already occurred around the Pico do Jaraguá, where several gold mines were explored by settlers such as Afonso Sardinha. Although they generated much less earnings when compared to the mines found by Paulistans in the states of Minas Gerais, Mato Grosso, and Goiás, the search for gold in the then São Paulo de Piratininga was probably the first mining experience in Portuguese America, motivating the creation of foundry houses already in the first century of colonization.

The first to explore and occupy the Minas territory, the Paulistans, soon faced competition from Portuguese-Brazilians from other regions of the colony, culminating in the conflict called War of the Emboabas. The Paulistan discovery for the first time aroused the Portuguese kingdom's attention in the village, since São Paulo, at that time, not only concentrated the departure of the expeditions, but also became the main source of the settlement currents that headed to Minas Gerais and, later, to Mato Grosso and Goiás. As a consequence, in 1709, São Paulo substituted São Vicente as the administrative seat of the captaincy (which changed its name to Captaincy of São Paulo e Minas de Ouro). In 1711, São Paulo was elevated to a city, and in 1745, became the seat of an autonomous bishopric, separating it from the diocese of Rio de Janeiro.

While the gold rush from Minas enriched many Paulistan pioneers, the effect on the city was the opposite. The emptying of the population impoverished São Paulo, which went through a long period of stagnation in its economic growth. With the exhaustion of the mining deposits in the second half of the 18th century, the situation worsened, and many Paulistans returned to their places of origin. With this new income of people, the city tried to reorganize its economic activity.

=== The sugar cycle ===
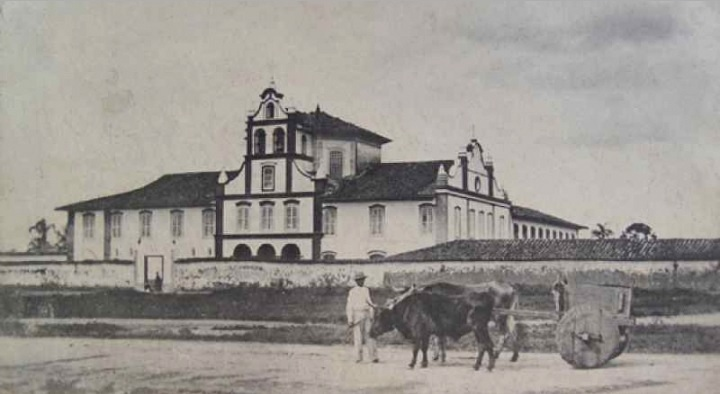
The Monastery of Luz, in a photograph from 1867.

The government of São Paulo began to develop a plan to settle its population in exploited areas of the captaincy and began to provide incentives for farming and industry. The planting of sugar cane was stimulated in the areas southeast of the capital, and large weaving and foundry factories were established. In 1792, the opening of the Calçada do Lorena, an important engineering work of the colonial period, a road connecting the cities of São Paulo and Santos, would provide adequate conditions for the transportation of sugar and other foodstuffs produced in the countryside of the captaincy. São Paulo benefits from its strategic geographical position as the natural crossroad of the circulation routes between the rural areas and the coast of the colony. It then affirmed its role as a commercial center, through which the produce was transported to the port of Santos.

Even intermittently, São Paulo began to prosper and new buildings were erected. In 1750, with the expulsion of the Jesuits from Brazil, this time by determination of the Marquis of Pombal, the order's property was confiscated. The Jesuit church, rebuilt in the early 18th century, is transformed into the administrative headquarters of the captaincy (now separated from Minas Gerais and renamed Captaincy de São Paulo). In 1765, the opera house of Pátio do Colégio was founded, the city's first theater, and in 1775 the Aflitos Cemetery was inaugurated, São Paulo's first necropolis, destined for the burial of the poor, slaves, and those sentenced to be hanged. Also from the 18th century are the Luz Monastery (a convent for nuns built in rammed earth, based on Frei Galvão's 1774 project) and the Church of the Wounds of the Seraphic Father São Francisco (1787), among others. In 1798, the city inaugurated its Botanical Garden (now the Jardim da Luz) Still in the late 18th century, on the initiative of Marshal José Arouche de Toledo Rendon, the city's urban limits were expanded with the opening of São João Street and the Marechal's bridge over the Anhangabaú River. The Campo do Curro, today known as Praça da República ("Square of the Republic"), began to be formed.

== Imperial period ==
=== The First Reign and the Law School ===
During most of the 19th century, São Paulo preserved the characteristics of a provincial city but saw its development possibilities grow after the transfer of the Portuguese royal family to Rio de Janeiro. The opening of the ports to friendly nations, decreed by João VI in 1808, gave a new boost to the economy of the São Paulo coast, while the countryside of the captaincy continued to register relative prosperity with the sugarcane plantation. The capital, located in the middle of the obligatory route for the outflow of sugar production, witnesses the development of commerce.

The political importance of the captaincy (which became a province in 1821) grew, and the city of São Paulo served as the stage for events of great importance in the history of the country. Among the most prominent names in the campaign for Brazilian independence was a Paulistan, José Bonifácio de Andrada e Silva. And it was in the São Paulo capital, on the banks of the Ipiranga Brook, that Pedro I proclaimed the independence of Brazil. The emperor's most famous mistress, the Marchioness de Santos, also lived in the city. Built in the late 18th century, the Marchioness de Santos Manor was listed in 1971 by CONDEPHAAT as part of the historical heritage of the state of São Paulo.

After the independence, São Paulo received the title of "Imperial City", granted by D. Pedro I in 1823. In 1825, the Public Library of São Paulo was created, the first in the province. In 1827, the city's first periodical, O Farol Paulistano, was launched. In 1828, the Law School of the University of São Paulo was inaugurated. This is the oldest law school in the country, along with the Olinda Law School, both established by imperial decree in 1827. After the college was established, the city was given the title "Imperial City and Student Borough of São Paulo de Piratininga". The consequent influx of teachers and students causes a radical change in the city's daily life. Besides demanding the construction of hotels, restaurants, and artistic centers, the agglomeration of academics enriched São Paulo's cultural life. Throughout history, the college (incorporated into the University of São Paulo in 1934) has formed a considerable part of the Brazilian intellectual and political elite, and its building (installed on the site of the former São Francisco Convent) was the stage for public acts and demonstrations related to numerous facts in the political life of the country.

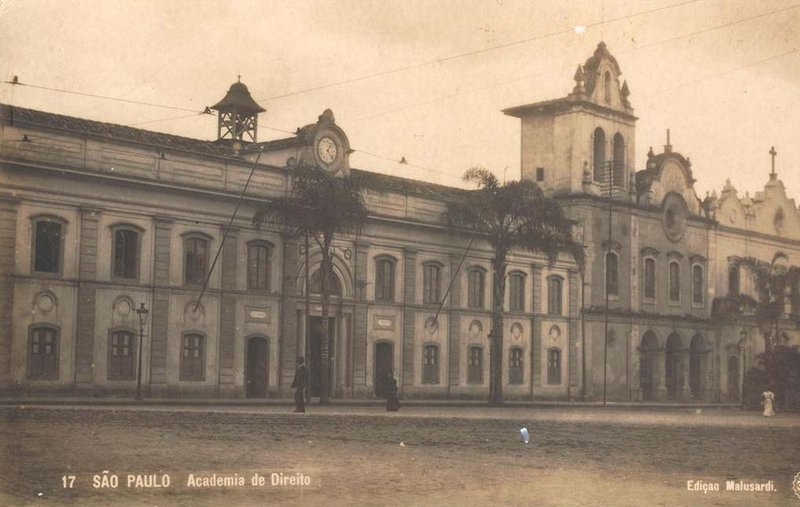
The Law School, housed in the former São Francisco Convent.

In 1830, journalist Libero Badaró, writer for the liberal Observador Constitucional (the city's second oldest periodical, founded in 1828), writes an article commenting on the 1830 Revolution in France, (that led to the deposition of Charles X), in which he urged Brazilians to follow the example of the French. Soon after, students from the Law School held public demonstrations in support of the republican ideas expressed in the journalist's article, and were legally threatened. The Observador Constitucional started a campaign in favor of the students, and tempers flare. On November 20 of that same year, Líbero Badaró was killed in an ambush. The repercussion in the city was immediate: five thousand people attended the funeral, and the clamor for justice led to the arrest of the ombudsman Cândido Japiaçu, accused of involvement in the murder. The main consequence of the episode was to reinforce the political weariness of Pedro I, who, for this and other reasons, renounced the throne the following year.

=== The Second Reign and the Coffee Cycle ===
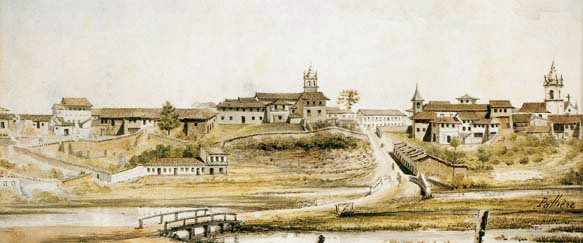
São Paulo in 1821. Watercolor by Arnaud Julien Pallière, representing Várzea do Carmo.

Since the first decades of the 19th century, the fall of sugar prices in international markets had motivated the cultivation of coffee in Brazil. Arriving from Rio de Janeiro, coffee began to be extensively cultivated in São Paulo, especially in the Paraíba Valley region. By 1850, coffee was already the main product exported by São Paulo. From the Paraíba Valley, the coffee plantations spread to the fertile lands (terra roxa, "red soil") of western São Paulo, previously occupied by sugarcane (Rio Claro, Campinas and Jaú), enriching the province. From the reign of Pedro II onward, the city gained new momentum with the development of the coffee economy: the commerce and service industry increased considerably, and an expressive bourgeoisie was formed.

Many farmers prospered, with profits from the use of salaried employees and the employment of immigrant labor. The abundance of financial resources allowed large investments, most of them financed by the private sector. Several railroads were opened, connecting the city of São Paulo to the main producing areas of the province and the port of Santos: The first was the São Paulo Railway, inaugurated in 1867, followed by the Sorocabana Railroad, finished in 1870. At the same time, in areas farther from the city center, which would later be reached by the vertiginous urban expansion of the 20th century, a rural way of life still predominated, with several farms distributed throughout this territory.

In the first national census, conducted in 1872, São Paulo counted 31,385 inhabitants. The city gained export houses and several financing banks. Its physiognomy began to change: the low, narrow houses gave way to larger, typically urban buildings. In order to guarantee salubrity, in 1858, the Consolação Cemetery was inaugurated, the oldest in operation in the city. In 1865, the São José Theater was founded. In 1872, water supply, wastewater, and gas lighting infrastructures were installed, and the animal-powered tramway transportation system was created. In 1884, the first telephone lines began to operate. To meet the educational needs of São Paulo's growing elite and alleviate problems arising from the lack of technical training, private enterprise inaugurated the first educational institutions (Mackenzie Presbyterian Institute in 1870, São Paulo School of Arts and Crafts in 1873, Colégio Visconde de Porto Seguro in 1878).

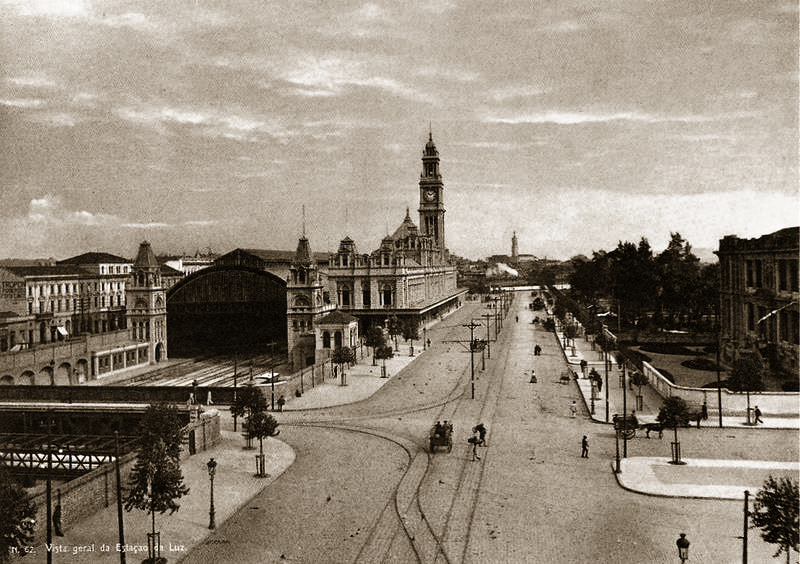
The Luz Station in 1900: symbol of the prosperity brought by coffee.

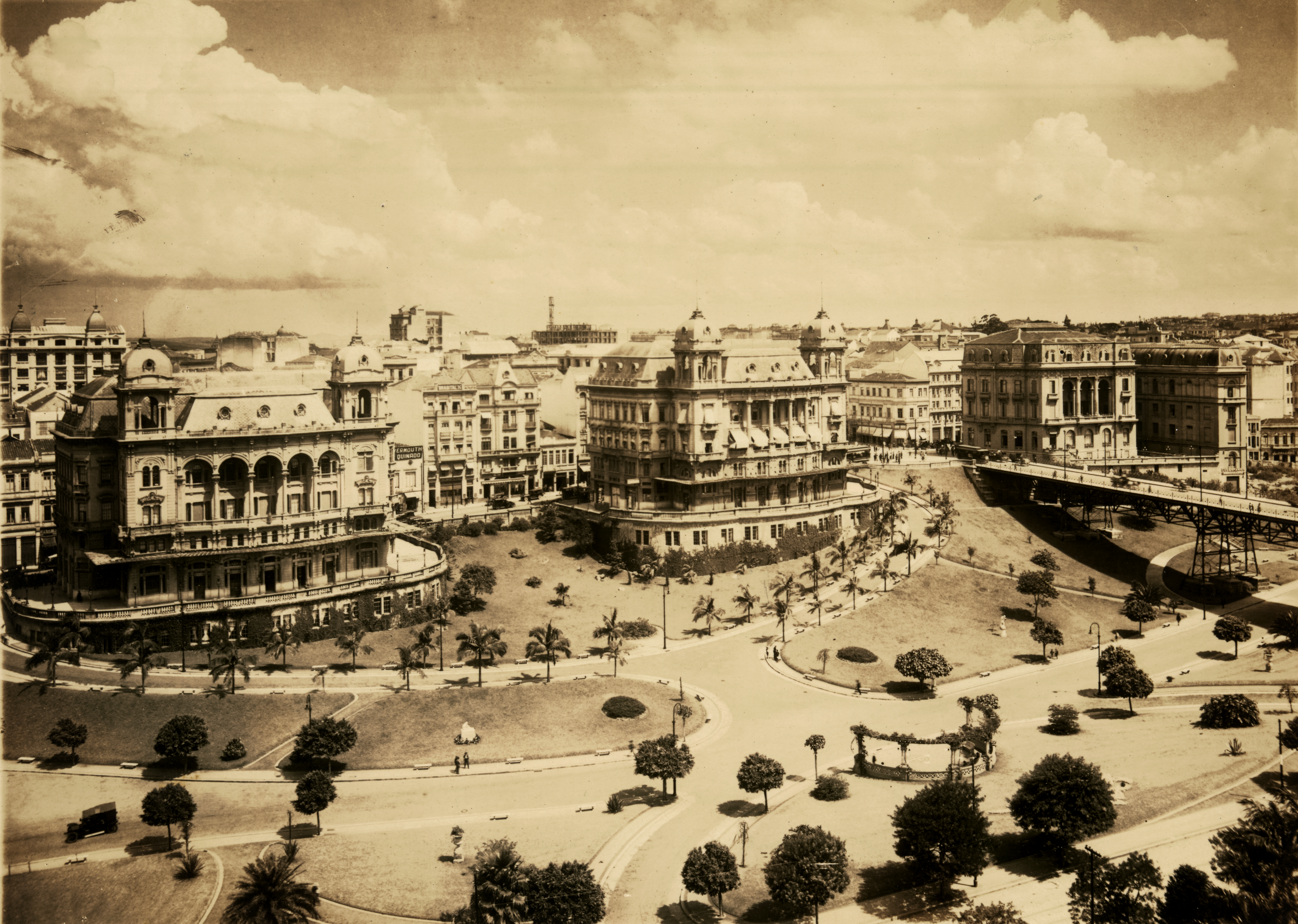
Vale do Anhangabaú in the 1920s. National Archives.

After the 1880s, coffee was once again valued internationally. Farmers from São Paulo, however, had to deal with the problem of a shortage of workers. After the promulgation of the Eusébio de Queirós Law and the consequent abolition of the slave trade, which occurred in 1850, enslaved blacks became scarce and increasingly expensive. To replace them, immigrants, especially Italians, began to arrive. A significant number of these immigrants settled in the capital, employing themselves in the first industries that were being established in the Brás and Mooca neighborhoods, based on investments from the profits made by entrepreneurs in the coffee-growing sector. In 1882, the Immigration Museum of the State of São Paulo was founded, first in Bom Retiro (1882) and later in Mooca (1885).

The wealth from the coffee plantations and a still incipient industry sustained the Paulistan leadership in the Republican movement. In 1873, the first republican convention in Brazil was held in Itu, and the Republican Party of São Paulo was created, which used the periodical Correio Paulistano as its official vehicle. With the extinction of slavery after the promulgation of the Lei Áurea, in 1888, the farmers from São Paulo demanded compensation for the loss of property. Unable to do so, they joined the republican movement as a form of pressure. The empire lost its last support base, as political and economic crises that began or worsened after the Paraguayan War had already removed the church and the military from such base, and the republic was proclaimed in Rio de Janeiro, on November 15, 1889.

== Old Republic ==
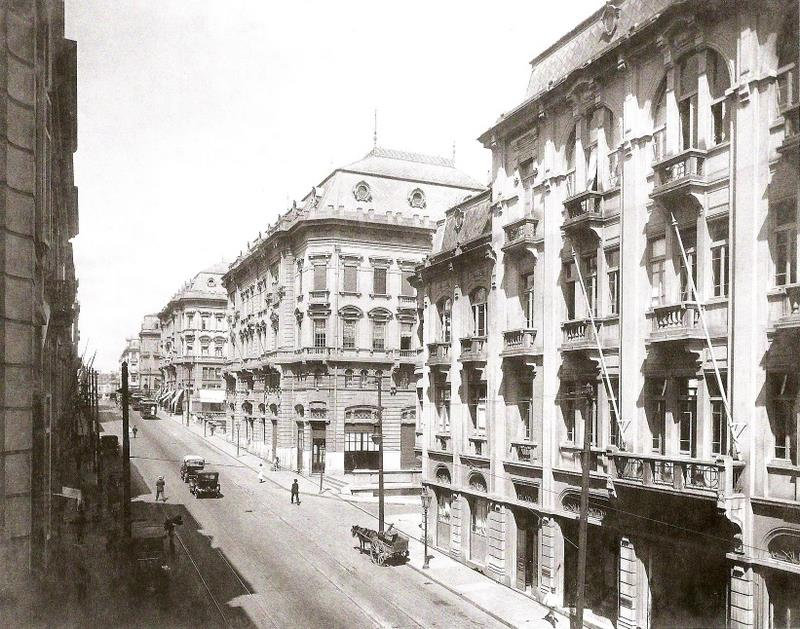
Guilherme Gaensly. Rua Libero Badaró ("Libero Badaró Street"), towards Praça do Patriarca, c. 1920. Moreira Salles Institute, São Paulo.

It was with the end of the Second Reign that the city of São Paulo, as well as the state of São Paulo, took great advantage of the situation and had considerable economic and population growth, a result of the milk coffee politics and structural changes of federalism in Brazil by the state of São Paulo, with the help of Minas Gerais. In 1890, the city had about 65,000 inhabitants, a population contingent that reached 240,000 in the year 1900.

The peak of the coffee period is represented by the construction of the second Luz Station (the building that today receives this name) at the end of the 19th century. In this period, the city's financial center moved from its historic center (the region called "Historic Triangle") to areas further west. The valley of the Anhangabaú River was landscaped and the region across the river came to be known as the New Center. The improvements made to the city by administrators João Teodoro Xavier and Antônio da Silva Prado contributed to the climate of development: scholars consider that the entire city was demolished and rebuilt. São Paulo's urbanization process from the turn of the 19th to the 20th century is a direct reflection of this context, agglutinating old villages (such as the current Pinheiros district) previously distant from São Paulo's original center.

In this period, the city is called by these scholars as the "city of masonry", since the adopted building system was masonry, especially the one imported from Europe. This change profoundly altered the city's landscape: its inhabitants considered the architectural styles from the colonial period as "old-fashioned" and "provincial", and started adopting the eclecticism made possible by masonry. The current Pinacoteca do Estado building (built in 1900 to house the São Paulo School of Arts and Crafts) is an example of this period in the city. These profound changes in São Paulo society were also manifested in domestic customs and practices, with the use of fine porcelain becoming more common among middle-class São Paulo families, as well as by the emergence of masonry residential buildings.

== 20th century ==
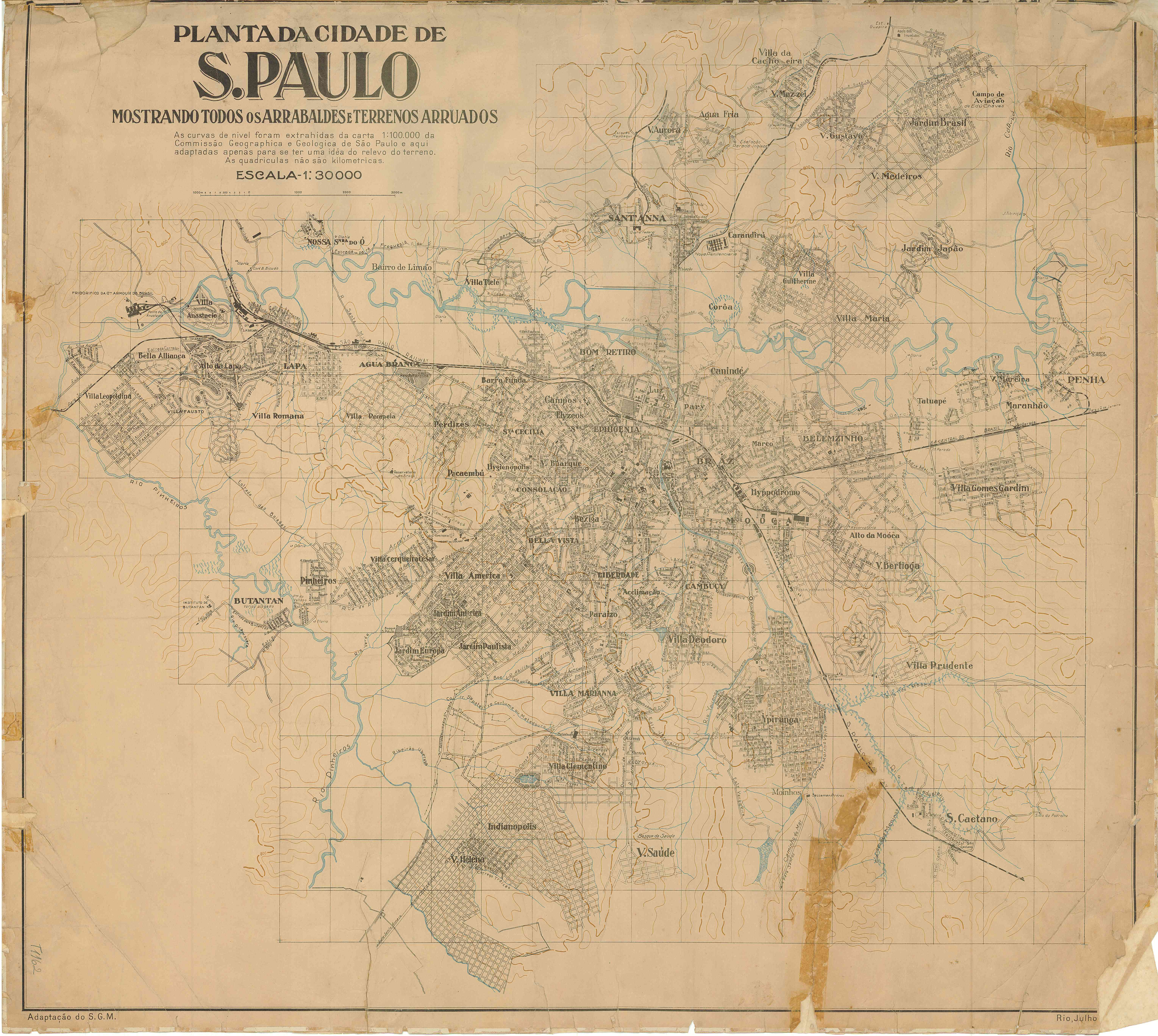
Map of the city in 1924.

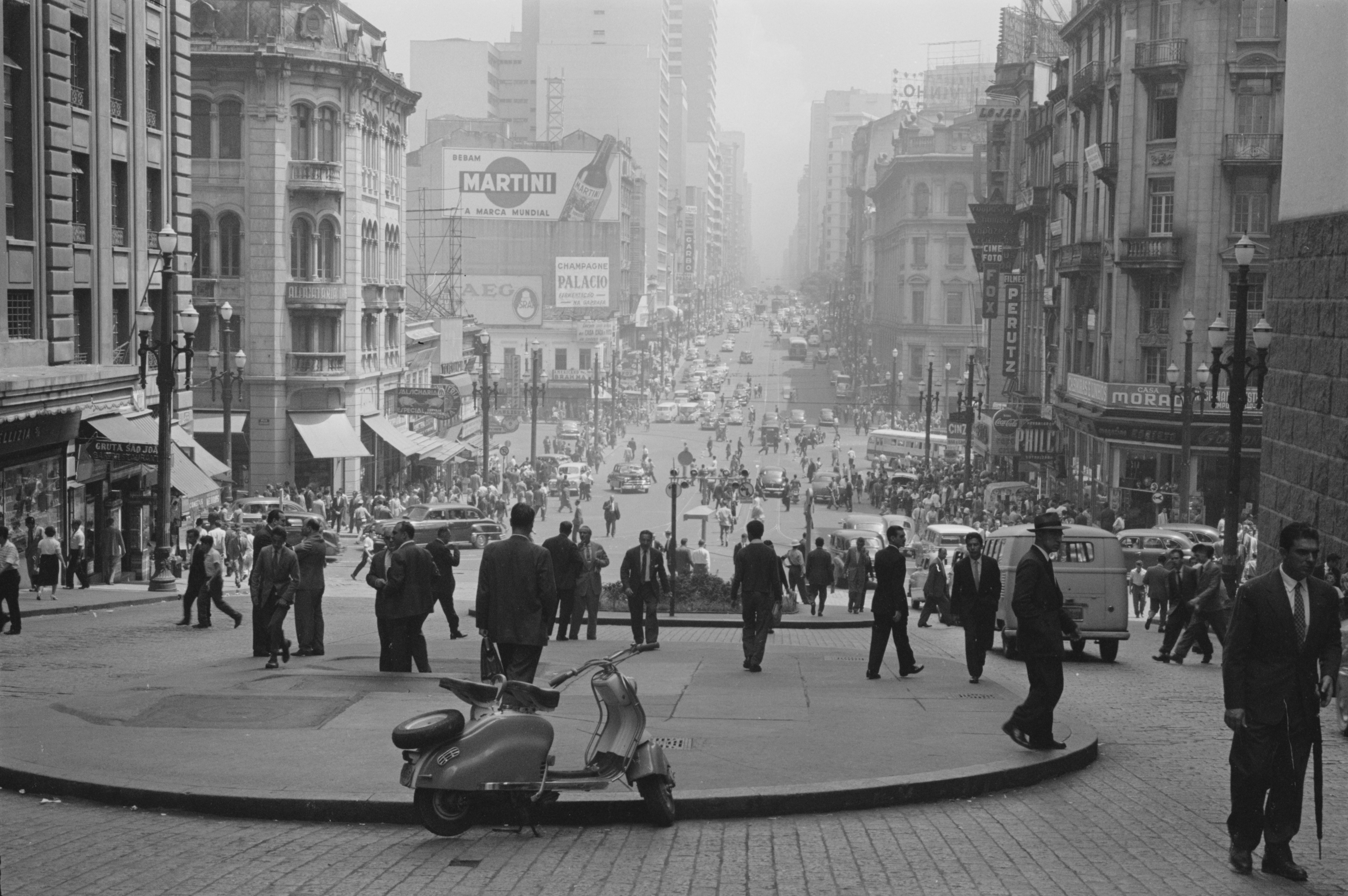
São Paulo in 1960

With the city's industrial growth, in the 19th and 20th centuries, its urbanized area started to increase at an accelerated rate, and some residential neighborhoods were built on farmland. The great industrial boom occurred during the Second World War, due to the coffee crisis and the restrictions on international trade, which caused the city to have a very high growth rate until the present day. One of the most prominent industries of this period is the conglomerate known as Indústrias Reunidas Fábrica Matarazzo, which had its industrial park of about 100,000 square meters located in the neighborhood of Água Branca, which operated between the 1920s and 1980s.

The end of the First Brazilian Republic, as well as the successive economic crises that shook coffee as a commodity in the first half of the 20th century, represented a political milestone not only nationally, but also in the city of São Paulo itself. In this period, movements such as the General Strike of 1917 and the São Paulo Revolt of 1924, in which the city was bombed by the federal government, symbolize the dimension of popular manifestations that were already occurring in São Paulo, as well as the federal government's willingness to vehemently repress such insurrections, even if at the cost of part of São Paulo's urban infrastructure.

Consequently, the so-called Constitutionalist Revolution represented a broader clash of political interests, in which part of the São Paulo elite contested the loss of political power on a national scale after the deposition of president Washington Luís. Despite São Paulo's defeat, a revealing fact of the maintenance of the political and economic prestige of the São Paulo elite was the creation of the University of São Paulo in 1934, with the function of providing instruction of excellence for this same elite, receiving several highly prestigious foreign professors in its initial years.

According to the 1960 census, the city of São Paulo had a population of 3,825,350 inhabitants. At that time, the city was already considered the most populous in Brazil, also concentrating most of the country's industrial production and economic activity. This rapid growth in the first half of the 20th century was due not only to foreign immigration but also to the arrival of Brazilians from various regions, mostly attracted by the demand for labor in the industries located in São Paulo. In the words of the geographer Pasquale Petrone, who wrote in 1951 about the rapid urban modification that São Paulo underwent in the 20th century:

As far as building construction is concerned, there seems to be no city that matches it: there is no street that does not offer a new roof, and rare are those that do not see a building constructed. Residential buildings, fine or modest, palatial or standardized bungalows, skyscrapers, 8 to 10 stories high, and giants over 25 stories high, with their reinforced concrete structure. While in New York a house is built every year for every 423 inhabitants, in Buenos Aires 134, in São Paulo the average is 102. In recent years the average annual increase in the number of buildings has been more than 18,000, although a total of more than 24,000 per year has been recorded. It can be stated, without fear of error, that a house is built in São Paulo every 20 minutes!

Currently, the growth in the city has been slowing down, due to the industrial development verified in other regions of Brazil. São Paulo is going through a transformation process in its economic profile, converting itself from an industrial center to a great center of commerce, services, and technology, and is currently one of the most important metropolises in the world.

== See also ==
- History of Brazil
- City of São Paulo
- Marco Zero

== Bibliography ==
- Porta, Paula, ed. (2004). História da cidade de São Paulo - 3 volumes (in Portuguese). São Paulo: Editora Paz e Terra.
- Toledo, Benedito Lima de (2004). São Paulo: três cidades em um século (in Portuguese). São Paulo: Editora Cosac e Naify. ISBN 85-7503-356-5.
- Toledo, Roberto Pompeu de (2004). A capital da solidão (in Portuguese). São Paulo: Editora Objetiva. ISBN 85-7302-568-9.
- Taunay, Afonso d'Escragnolle. História da Cidade de São Paulo.
