= Piquerobi (cacique) =

Brazilian native tribal chief

Piquerobi (c. 1480 – 9 July 1562) was a Tupiniquim leader who fought to expel European settlers from the Captaincy of São Vicente. He became known for fighting in the Iguape War (Guerra de Iguape) and in the Siege of Piratininga (Cerco de Piratininga), where he died. He was brother of cacique Tibiriçá.

== Etymology ==
The name "Piquerobi" derives from the Old Tupi pikyroby, which means "piquiras", a species of small fish, through the joining of pikyra (piquira) and oby (green).

== History ==
At the time of Portuguese colonization in Brazil, native Brazilian tribes of different ethnicities lived in the region of today's city of São Paulo. Tibiriçá was the leader of the village of Inhapuambuçu, in the central region of Piratininga, which after the arrival of the Jesuits was called São Paulo de Piratininga. Caiubi, brother of Piquerobi and Tibiriçá, was chief of the village of Jurubatuba (today Santo Amaro, a suburb of Greater São Paulo city).

At the beginning of colonization in São Vicente, the Portuguese explorers João Ramalho and António Rodrigues, married native Indians; João Ramalho with Bartira, the daughter of Tibiriçá and Antonio Rodrigues with Antónia Ussú (born Assú-Piquerobi), daughter of chief Piquerobi. Although Piquerobi had a Portuguese son-in-law, he disagreed with Tibiriçá, who had become a Christian and allowed pioneers and Jesuits to settle in the region, who began to enslave the Indians and interfere in religious rituals.

Piquerobi was an indigenous leader, known as "Cacique Piqueroby, morubixaba (warrior chief) of the Guaianá dos Hururahy tribe." His lands ranged from the old Vila Nossa Senhora da Penha de França (in São Paulo de Piratininga) to the region that was named by the Jesuits as São Miguel dos Ururaí (São Miguel Paulista) on the east side of São Paulo, to the former Cangaíva (Cangaíba) and Jaguaporeruba (Ermelino Matarazzo) villages.

In 1534, in an attempt to expel the colonists, Piquerobi joined the Spaniards, along with some Portuguese, to attack the Vila de São Vicente, looting and destroying it, in a conflict that lasted two years and became known as the Iguape War.

Years later Piquerobi joined the Carijó and Guaru tribes to attack the Tibiriçá village, but his brother learned of the attack days before and managed to prepare for the offensive. It was the first war between natives and Portuguese on the São Paulo plateau and was known as the Siege of Piratininga. With the support of the Portuguese, Tibiriçá emerged victorious, having assassinated his brother Piquerobi and Piquerobi's son, Jaguaranho, in July 1562.

In different regions of the country many conflicts involved indigenous lands and exterminated various tribes. By the end of the 18th century and the mid-19th century in São Paulo, indigenous relics were already rare. Many indigenous names remain which point to the native characteristics of the regions that were subsequently transformed into farms. When urban industrialization arrived in the 20th century they, in turn, became bairros within the city of São Paulo or became suburbs of São Paulo city.
