= Tibiriçá =

Brazilian tribal leader

Chief Tibiriçá
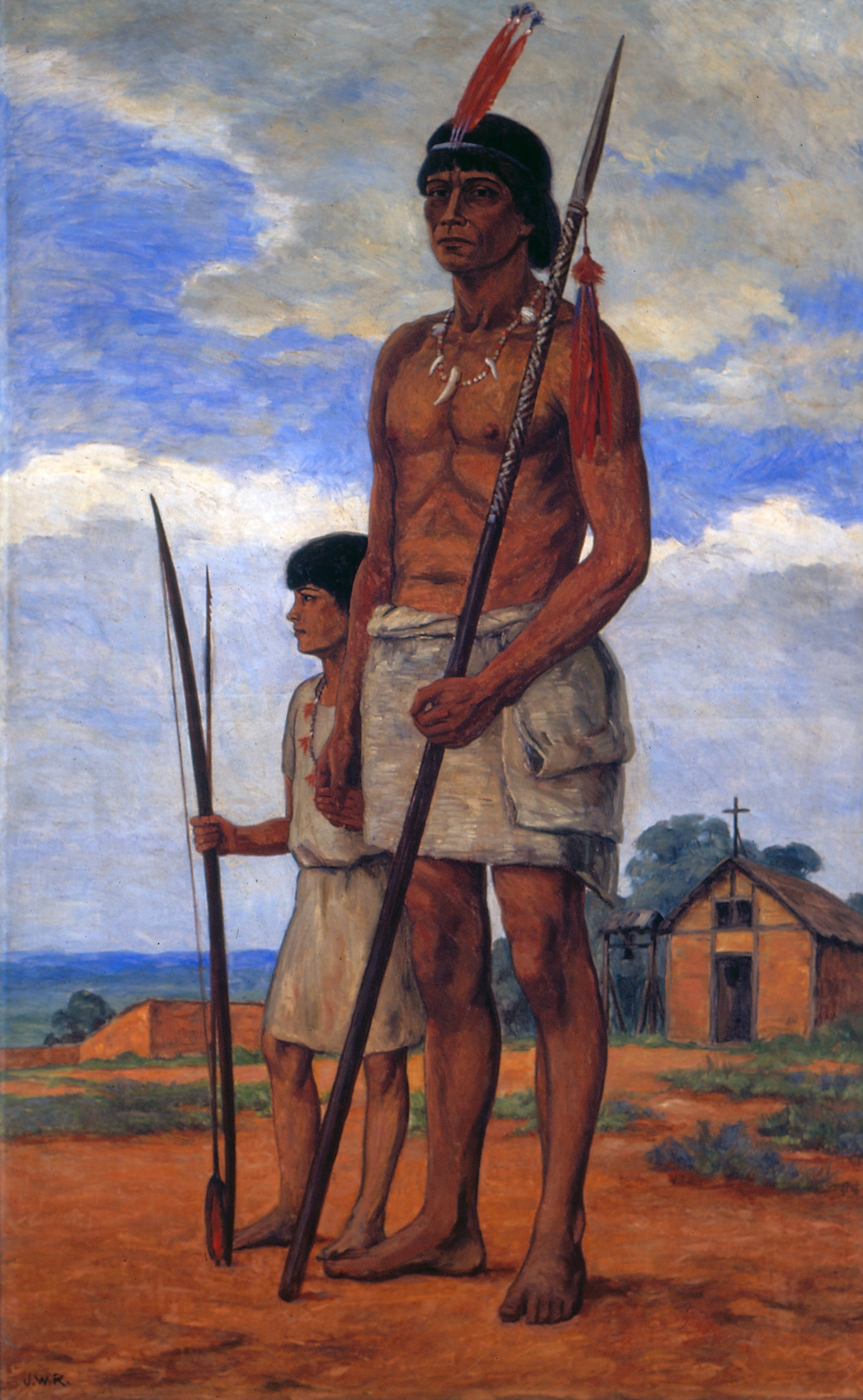
- Tibiriçá by José Wasth Rodrigues
- Died: 25 December 1562; São Paulo, Brazil (Buried at São Paulo Cathedral)
- Occupation: paramount chief of Piratininga (modern São Paulo)
- Children: Bartira and others

Chief Tibiriçá (died 25 December 1562) baptized as Martim Afonso was an Amerindian leader who converted to Christianity under the auspices of José de Anchieta. He led the Tupiniquim people of Piratininga and other tribes. His daughter, Bartira, took the name Isabel and married a Portuguese man named João Ramalho. After his conversion to Christianity he became a strategic ally and protector of the Jesuits and the Portuguese; his name appears on letters to Saint Ignatius of Loyola and King João III of Portugal. Tibiriçá chose to side with the Jesuits and against his own brother Piquerobi with help of his nephew and his son-in-law João Ramalho. His granddaughters and their descendants married Portuguese noblemen that led the colonization of São Paulo under Martim Afonso de Sousa, including Jorge Ferreira, Domingos Luiz (a knight of the Order of Christ), and Tristão de Oliveira, son of capitão-mor Antonio de Oliveira and Genebra Leitão de Vasconcelos, both of important noble families.

== Etymology ==
The writer Eduardo Bueno, based on Teodoro Sampaio, says that "Tibiriçá" means "watchman of the land" in Tupi, also fitting the expression "sentinel of the mountains". The writer and researcher Clóvis Chiaradia states that Tibiriçá comes from the Tupi Tibi-r-eçá (tibi, "your land" + eçá, "eye", "to see" or "seen"), meaning "the watchman of the land", agreeing with Eduardo Bueno and Teodoro Sampaio. Tupinologist Eduardo de Almeida Navarro argues that "Tibiriçá" and "Tebireçá" come from the Tupi tebiresá, which means "eye of the buttocks" (tebira, "buttock" + esá, "eye").

== Biography ==
He was converted and baptized by the Jesuits José de Anchieta and Leonardo Nunes. His Christian baptismal name was Martim Afonso, in honor of the founder of São Vicente, Martim Afonso de Sousa, changing his name to Martim Afonso Tibiriçá. He was head (Morubixaba, in old tupi) of a part of the indigenous nation established in the fields of Piratininga, based in the village of Inhampuambuçu. He was the brother of Piquerobi and Caiubi, indigenous men who stood out during the Portuguese colonization of Brazil: the first, as an enemy of the Portuguese; and the second, as a great collaborator of the Jesuits. He had many children. With the Indian Potira, he had Ítalo, Ará, Pirijá, Aratá, Toruí, Bartira and Maria da Gra.

Bartira would marry João Ramalho, of whom Tibiriçá was a great friend and at the request of which he defended the Portuguese when they arrived in São Vicente. In 1554, he accompanied Manuel da Nóbrega and Anchieta in the work of founding São Paulo and established himself in the place where the São Bento Monastery is now located, scattering the natives throughout the vicinity. The current Rua de São Bento was, for this reason, originally called Martim Afonso (the name in which the cacique was baptized). Thanks to his influence, the Jesuits were able to group the first neophyte huts in the vicinity of the college. In the attack known as the Siege of Piratininga, Tibiriçá gave the Jesuits the greatest proof of fidelity on 9 July 1562 (not the 10th as is usually written), when, while raising the flag and a wooden sword painted and decorated in different colors, he bravely repelled the attack on the village of São Paulo carried out by the Tupi, Guaianás and Carijós Indians and led by his nephew Jaguaranho (son of Piquerobi). During the fighting, Tibiriçá killed his brother Piquerobi and his nephew Jaguaranho.

Tibiriçá died on 25 December 1562, as José de Anchieta attests in his letter sent to Father Diogo Laínes, due to a plague that devastated the village. His remains are found in the crypt of the Catedral da Sé (São Paulo Cathedral).

In his honor, the state highway SP-031, linking Ribeirão Pires to Suzano, was named Índio Tibiriçá, in addition to having his name on two streets in the capital, one in Luz and the other in Brooklin Paulista.

== Descendants ==
Tibiriçá has left many descendants in Brazil and elsewhere, via his daughters, who had offspring with Portuguese settlers. The author Amador Bueno and his descendants, for example.

In 1580, Susana Dias, his granddaughter, founded a farm on the banks of the Tietê River, west of the city of São Paulo, near the waterfall called "Parnaíba" by the indigenous people: today it is the city of Santana de Parnaíba.

Queen Silvia of Sweden is one of numerous descendants of Susana Dias.

His ancestry is described in the Genealogia Paulistana, by Luís Gonzaga da Silva Leme.
