= Paleoamerind =

Paleoamerind or Paleo-Amerind may refer to:

- the Siberian ancestors of the Amerinds, see Ancestral Native American
- a proposed early population reaching America, not derived from Siberia, see Pleistocene peopling of the Americas

== See also ==
- Genetic history of indigenous peoples of the Americas#Paleoamericans
- Fuegians#Alternative origin speculations
- Paleo-Indian
- Amerind (disambiguation)
