= Piquerobi =

Piquerobi may refer to:

- Piquerobi (cacique) (c. 1480–1562), Tupiniquim leader who fought to expel European settlers from the captaincy of São Vicente, Brazil
- Piquerobi, São Paulo, a municipality in the state of São Paulo, Brazil
