= Rui Mosquera =

Rui Mosquera may have been the Spanish code name for Francisco de Chaves. He lived in the colonial period and, allied with the Tupiniquim Indians in Brazil and in the company of Sebastian Cabot, led an offensive force against the Portuguese, taking Iguape and sacking São Vicente.

Always loyal to his father-in-law the Bachelor of Cananeia Cosme Fernandes, when exiled, he joined him. With the possibility of obtaining four hundred slaves loaded with gold and silver, he became involved with those responsible for an ambush against the best warriors of Martim Afonso de Sousa and Captain Pero Lobo, who were killed by Indians from the Serra de Curitiba. Along with the Bachelor, Francisco de Chaves returned to Iguape and Cananeia, fleeing from a possible Portuguese punishment due to the invasion of São Vicente in 1534. According to Carlos Fabra (2010), Rui Mosquera withdrew with his companions to Santa Catarina and then to Buenos Aires, on the occasion of the participation in the work of Mendoza.
