= Santo André da Borda do Campo =

Former Brazilian settlement

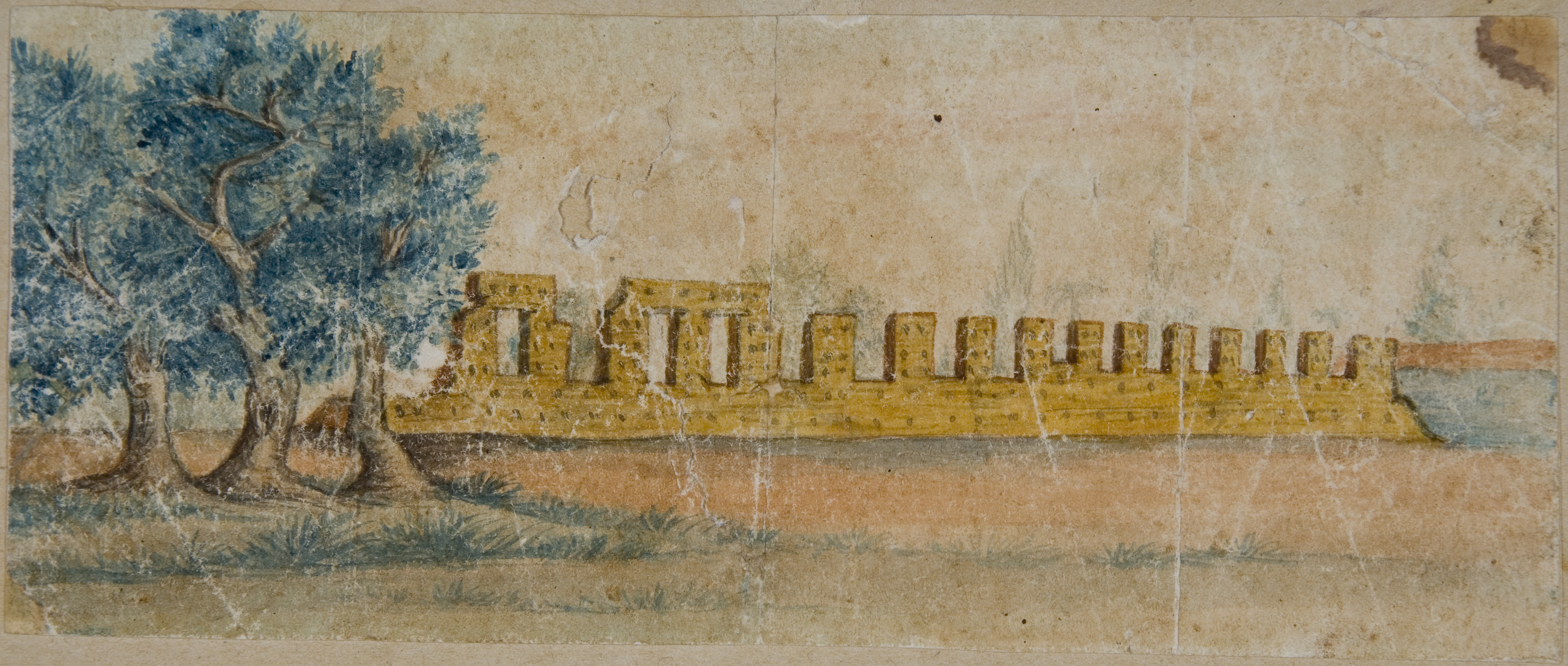
Ruins of Santo André da Borda do Campo, watercolor by Miguel Arcanjo Benício de Assunção Dutra.

Santo André da Borda do Campo was the first European settlement in Portuguese America to be established away from the coast. It was located in the Captaincy of São Vicente, between the fields of the Piratininga plateau and the woods of the Paranapiacaba mountain range, an area that is currently occupied by the municipalities of São Caetano do Sul, Santo André and São Bernardo do Campo.

The settlement was founded by João Ramalho at the suggestion of Father Leonardo Nunes, possibly in 1550. Elevated to the category of town by Tomé de Sousa in 1553 and pressured by attacks from the natives, the population relocated to the Jesuit settlement of São Paulo de Piratininga in 1560, where the Pátio do Colégio is today, at the request of Manuel da Nóbrega and by order of the then Governor-General Mem de Sá.

== History ==
=== Foundation ===
In 1553, after the town of São Vicente and the port of Santos had been founded, Martim Afonso de Sousa, guided by João Ramalho - a Portuguese who had been living in Brazil for around 20 years - established another settlement nine leagues (around 63 km) inland, on the banks of a river called Piratininga, along with a chapel dedicated to Saint Andrew.

Tomé de Sousa appointed João Ramalho as Captain-Major of Santo André da Borda do Campo, which received its municipal pillory a few months later. Curiously, the town never had a permanent priest or parish priest and, after São Paulo was founded on January 25, 1554, Jesuits went there periodically to celebrate mass and other religious activities. However, the settlement suffered constant attacks from the Tamoio indigenous people who inhabited the banks of the Paraíba do Sul River, which led to the construction of a trench around the site.

=== Crisis and retreat ===
In 1560, the then Governor-General Mem de Sá ordered the transfer of the town of Santo André to São Paulo, based on demands from the priests and "popular" appeals, including from members of the local council. The alleged reasons for the village's extinction were the difficulties of transporting the priests from São Paulo to Santo André and the problems of supplies, defense and security. Benefited by its strategic location and the presence of the Jesuit College, the village of São Paulo was elevated to the category of town and received the pillory, symbol of municipal authority.

The remains of Santo André began to disappear, and by 1571 there were only few traces of the extinct village. To this day, the exact location of this first settlement is unknown. Apparently, it was somewhere in the territory of the present-day cities of São Bernardo do Campo or Santo André.

== After the retreat ==
=== Sesmaria and farms ===
In 1561, Amador de Medeiros was granted a sesmaria near the Tamandatiiba River (currently called Ribeirão dos Meninos), in the region of Ipiranga and Jabaquara. These territories correspond to part of the extinct town of Santo André da Borda do Campo. On April 24, 1637, Miguel Aires Maldonado, Amador de Medeiros' son-in-law, donated the sesmaria he had inherited from his father-in-law to the Monastery of Saint Benedict, in exchange for an annual mass for the souls of his in-laws, donors and descendants.

Also in the area, the Benedictine monks created the São Bernardo and the São Caetano farms, which gave rise to the current cities in the ABC region.

=== Modern cities ===
Although the current cities of Santo André and São Bernardo do Campo do not originate from the old village, both consider the year of their foundation to be 1553, since they cover the region where the settlement was possibly located. The town that created the current cities of the ABC region began to develop after the end of the War of the Natives in the 16th century, and was consolidated in the 18th century when the neighborhoods of Caaguaçu (now Santo André), São Bernardo and São Caetano do Tijucuçu (now São Caetano do Sul) emerged and were registered in 1765.

The current municipality of Santo André, formerly called São Bernardo, originated at the São Paulo Railway station in the 19th century. When the town was administratively separated from the municipality of São Bernardo, it received its current name.

== See also ==
- Captaincy of São Vicente
