= Henrique Montes =

Explorer in colonial Brazil

- Occupation(s): Castaway, explorer, slaver

Henrique Montes was an early colonial explorer in Brazil, a veteran, like Melchior Ramirez, of the Armada of Juan Díaz de Solís.

He had practical duties and was in charge of the supply ship. For many years, he lived in São Vicente where he developed his activities up to the Rio da Prata with Gonçalo da Costa and the Bachelor of São Vicente, but he did not prosper with them and became helpless, denoting a possible misunderstanding in the desire to possess the Ilha Pequena to arrest slaves of the Jurubatuba tribe, where he settled for two years with permission from Martim Afonso de Sousa.

Having interfered with the disruption of power of Bachelor Cosme Fernandes, his existence came to an end before the forces of Rui Mosquera.
