= Carijó =

Carijós
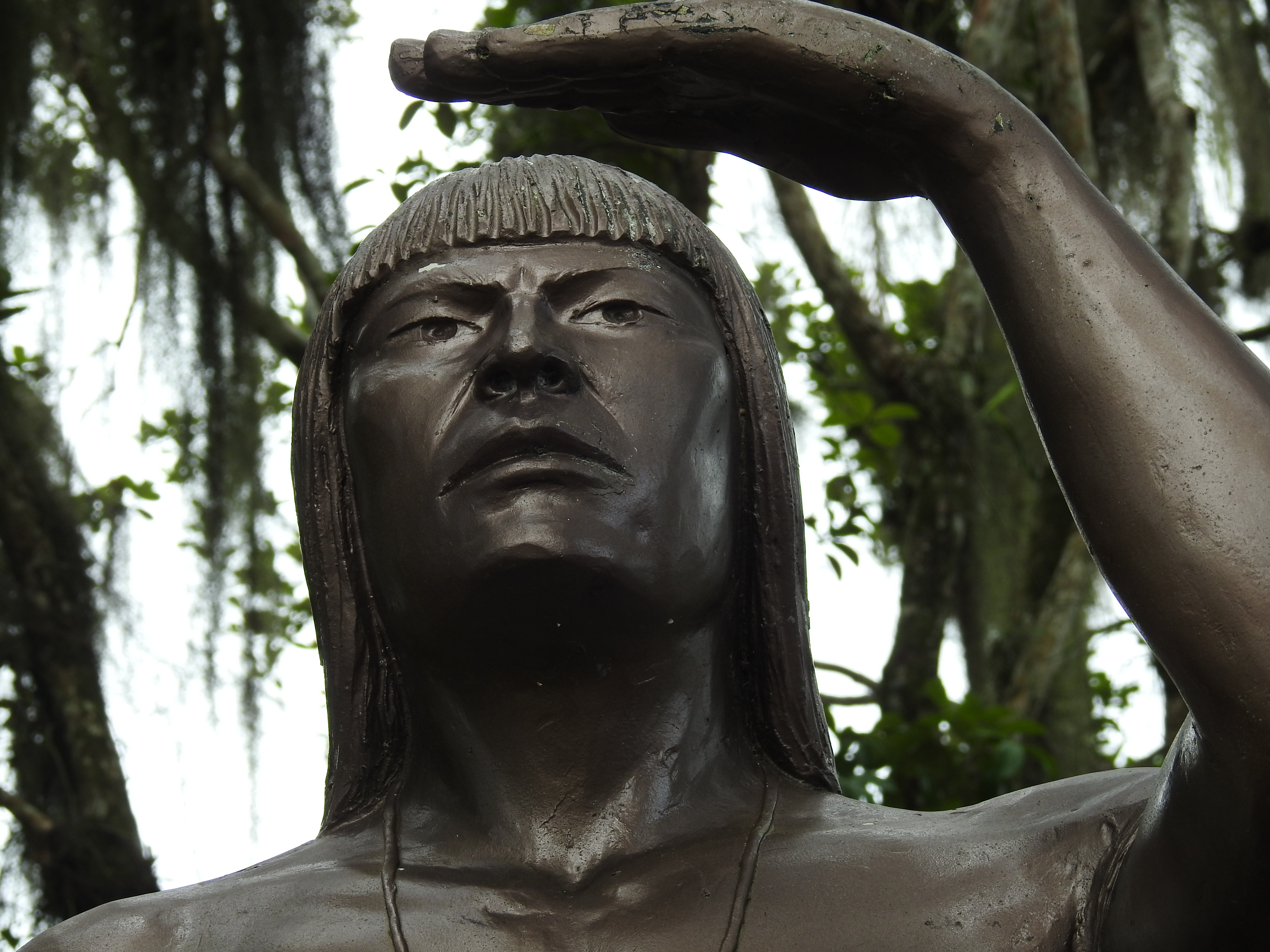
- Statue of a Carijó warrior in Bertioga, São Paulo

Total population
- 0 (extinct), c. 100,000 in the 16th century

Regions with significant populations
- Brazil and Paraguay

Languages
- Old Guarani

The Carijós, also known as Carios, were a Indigenous people who spoke a language of the Guarani language family that inhabited a stretch of the Brazilian coast ranging from the city of Cananéia, São Paulo, to the Lagoa do Patos, Rio Grande do Sul, as well as the region surrounding the Paraguayan capital of Asuncion.

== History ==
The Carijó language was part of the Guarani language family. The Carijó likely immigrated to the Southern Brazilian coast from the region where modern day Paraguay is. They were considered 'respectable' by the Portuguese colonial authorities for being 'hard-working', 'good of heart' and for not practicing cannibalism.

The first contact between the Portuguese and the Carijós occurred when a Portuguese ship sank near the island of Santa Catarina. Some of the people onboard managed to swim to the coast, including Henrique Montes, the Spaniard explorer Melchior Ramirez, the African seaman Francisco Pacheco and others; these castaways settled on the island, marrying local Carijó women and starting mestizo families. The Carijós were described by the Portuguese colonizers as "the best pagans of the new world coast", and were quite accepting of Christianization. The Carijós participated in the 1554 indigenous raiding of the then recently established village of São Paulo dos Campos de Piratininga, killing part of the European settlers, African slaves and hundreds of cattle.

During the colonization of Paraguay, Spanish explorer Juan de Ayolas found Carijós by the riverside of a stream 20 kilometers upstream of the main water body of the Pilcomayo river, these Carijós lived in a village that was protected by wooden palisades and a shallow moat, which indicates that these people had conflicts with neighboring tribes and had developed fortifications. The Spanish defeated the Carijós and founded a village that became the modern day city of Asuncion, capital of Paraguay. This event further confirms the idea that the Carijós originally came from the Paraguay region, as the tribe encountered by Juan de Ayolas was likely one of the branches of the Carijós that stayed behind rather than moving east.

== Etymology ==
The term "Carijó" comes from the Tupi word karai-yo, meaning "descendants of the ancient ones". Its also theorized that the name might have come from the Tupi word kariîó.

== Culture ==
Carijó houses were covered with tree bark, they slept in hammocks and wore coats made of cotton, animal pelt and feathers. They kept birds as pets and used them to acquire the feathers used in their clothing.
