= João Ramalho =

Portuguese explorer (1493–1582)

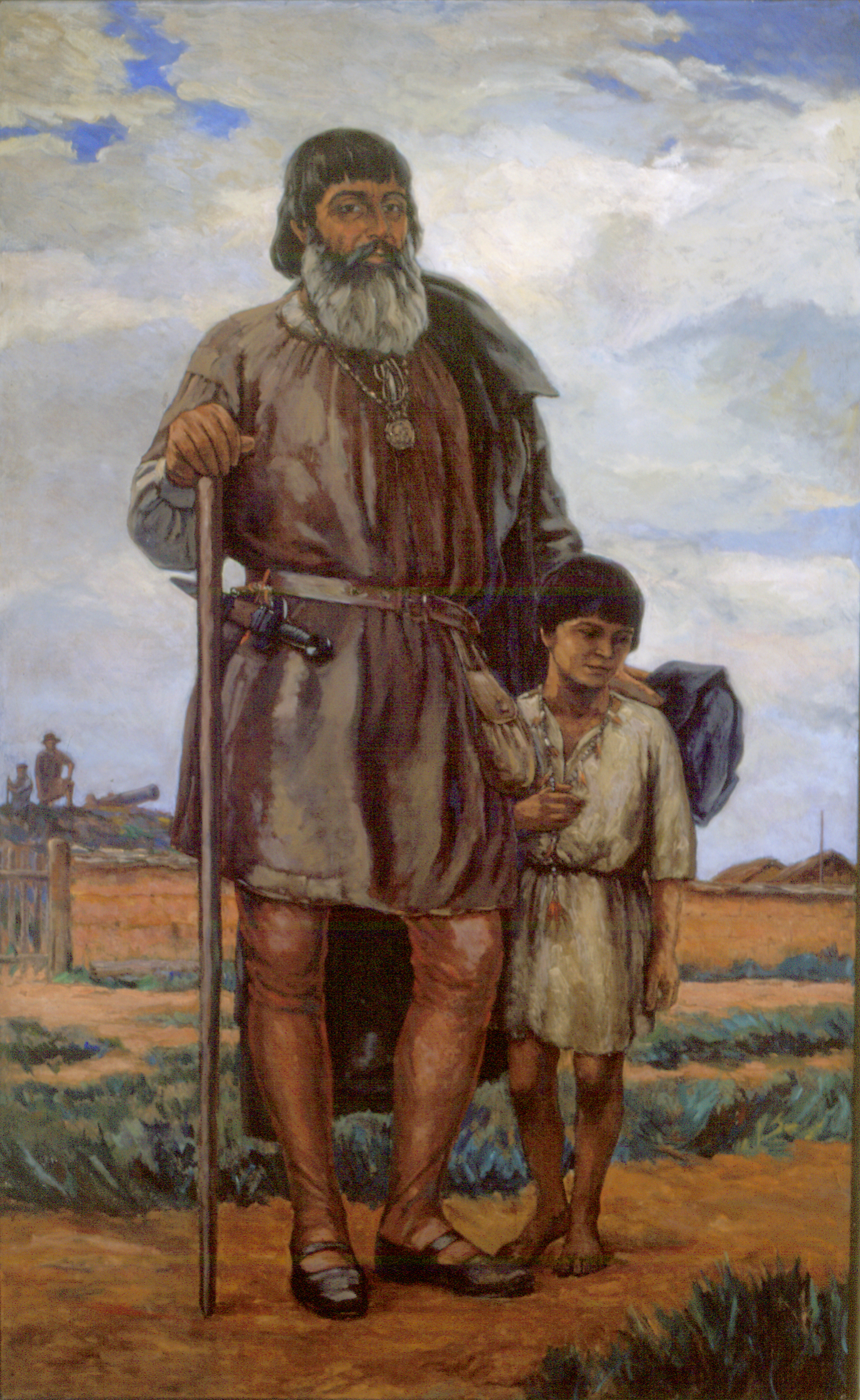
- Fancy portrait by José Wasth Rodrigues, 1934
- Born: 1493; Vouzela, Portugal
- Died: 1582 (aged 88–89); São Paulo, Brazil
- Occupation: Explorer
- Spouse(s): Catarina Fernandes; Bartira and other daughters of native chiefs

João Ramalho (Portuguese pronunciation: [ʒuˈɐ̃w ʁɐˈmaʎu]) (1493–1582) was a Portuguese explorer and adventurer known as the first bandeirante. He lived much of his life among Tupiniquim natives in Brazil after he arrived there around 1510. He even became the leader of an Indian village after he developed a friendship with Tibiriçá, an important native chief at the time. Ramalho played an important role in the peaceful interaction between the Portuguese and the natives, especially after the arrival of Martim Afonso de Sousa, with whom he became friends after meeting him in São Vicente, the first Portuguese settlement in the Americas. Some historians agree that his ancestors were Jews from Covilhã.

He lived in the village of Santo André da Borda do Campo, which in 1553 was made a town by Tomé de Sousa, then Governor General of Brazil. Ramalho exercised the posts of alderman and alcalde (mayor) in the town.

Ramalho is said to have originated the first mamelucos (people of mixed Portuguese and native ancestry), an ethnicity that played an important role in the 17th-century bandeiras (westward inland expeditions carried out by explorers known as bandeirantes). For that reason, he is often called the "Patriarch of the Bandeirantes".

In historical records, Ramalho is described as an athletic man with a long beard and a brown skin originating from sunburn. According to some sources, his original name was João Maldonado.

In 1580, Ramalho fell ill and, on 3 May of that year, wrote his will. He died in 1582 in an unknown location in the jungle.

== Legacy ==
The municipality of João Ramalho, in São Paulo, is named after him.
