= Pátio do Colégio =

Historic building in São Paulo, Brazil

Pátio do Colégio Pateo do Collegio (archaic spelling)
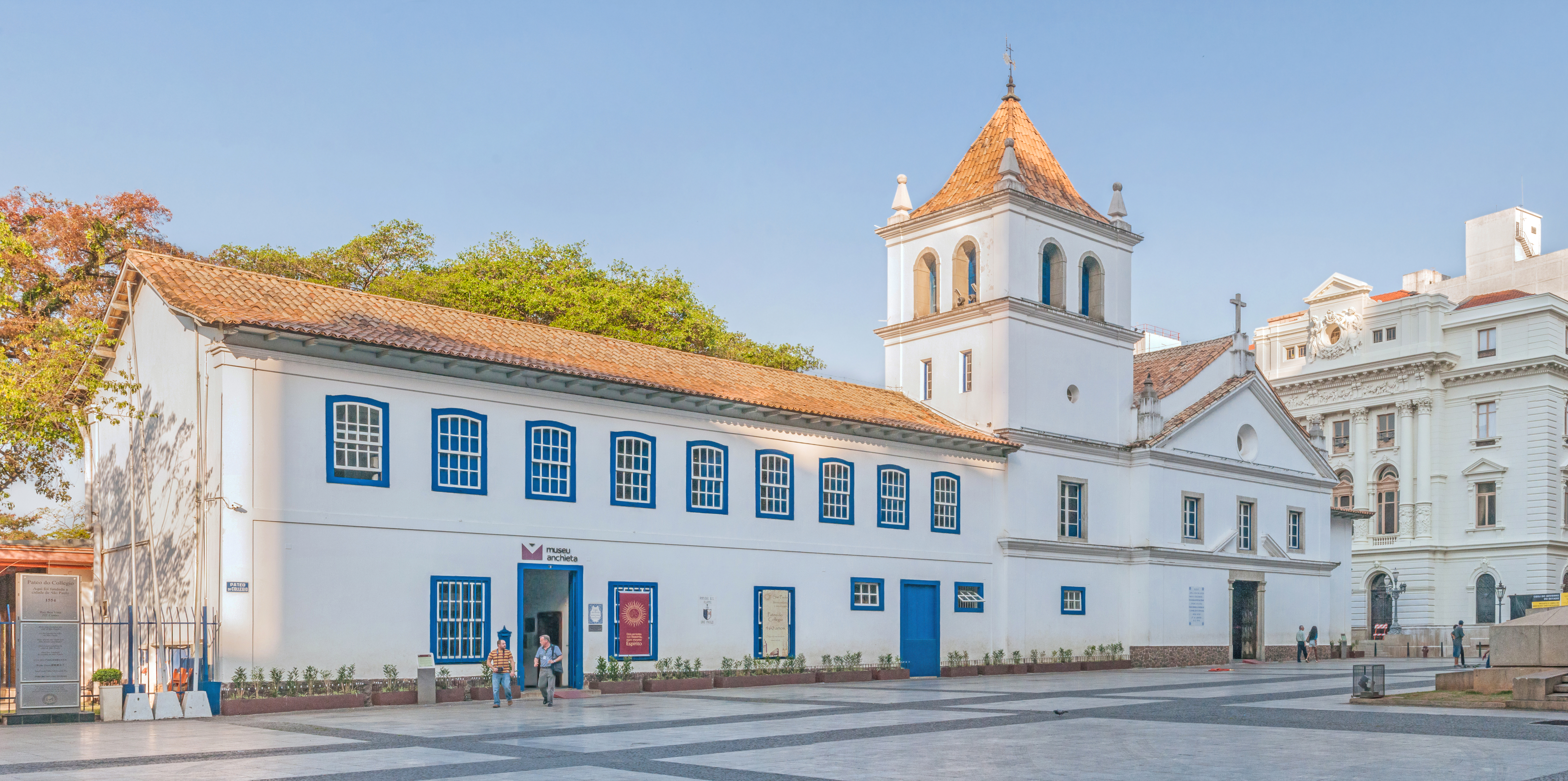

Religion
- Affiliation: Roman Catholic
- Ecclesiastical or organisational status: Built
- Status: Museum

Location
- Location: São Paulo, Brazil
- Interactive map of Pátio do Colégio; Pateo do Collegio (archaic spelling)
- Coordinates: 23°32′53″S 46°37′57″W

Architecture
- Style: Portuguese Colonial
- Groundbreaking: 1554

Pátio do Colégio (in Portuguese School Yard, written in the archaic orthography Pateo do Collegio) is the name given to the historical Jesuit church and school in the city of São Paulo, Brazil. The name is also used to refer to the square in front of the church. The Pátio do Colégio marks the site where the city was founded in 1554.

The city of São Paulo has its beginnings in a mission established by Jesuits Manuel da Nóbrega, José de Anchieta and others in the Brazilian hinterland. The village - then called São Paulo dos Campos de Piratininga - was founded on a plateau between two rivers, the Tamanduateí and the Anhangabaú, and was linked to the coastal village of São Vicente by a precarious path in the rainforest.

The date that marks the beginning of São Paulo is January 25, 1554, when the priests celebrated the inaugural mass of the Jesuit school. Initially, the church building was a modest hut covered with palm leaves or straw. In 1556, under father Afonso Brás, new buildings of the school and church were finished using taipa de pilão (rammed earth), a more solid technique. These buildings would be the centre of spiritual and educational life in the settlement in the next couple of centuries.

Since its beginnings, the Jesuit action in evangelising the Amerinds clashed with the interests of many settlers, who used indigenous slave labour and profited from the indigenous slave trade. In the early São Paulo, the expeditions of the bandeirantes to the hinterland in order to capture Amerinds were an important economic activity, and the conflicts with the Jesuits led to the expulsion of the Order from the village in 1640. Only in 1653, bandeirante Fernão Dias Pais Leme allowed the return of the Jesuit priests. The church and school were extensively rebuilt around 1653.

In 1759, with the Suppression of the Society of Jesus in Portugal and its colonies ordered by the Marquis of Pombal, the fathers had to leave again. The Jesuit buildings now housed the colonial governors of São Paulo, and they continued to serve administrative functions after the Independence of Brazil and well into the 20th century. The colonial structures were completely rebuilt in different styles, and in 1896 the church collapsed. The tower survived but was greatly modified.

In 1953, during the celebrations of the city's 400th anniversary, the area was given back to the Jesuit order. Thanks to their relative simple architecture and the abundance of 19th-century iconography, the church was rebuilt and the tower and the school façade were given back their colonial look. The church and tower, in particular, have the sober Mannerist style they had in the 17th century, typical of Jesuit churches of colonial Brazil.

== Anchieta Museum ==
In 1979, a museum dedicated to Father José de Anchieta was inaugurated in the Pátio do Colégio. It contains more the 600 items including colonial paintings, altarpieces and sculptures, documents and iconography pertaining Jesuit action in Brazil. 17th century portraits of José de Anchieta and writer and priest António Vieira, another important Jesuit figure, are highlights of the collection. Particularly informative is also a scale model of the Pátio do Colégio area at the time of the founding of São Paulo and the panels that show the development of this area of the city through the centuries.

== See also ==
- List of Jesuit sites
