= Bartira =

Tupiniquim people

Bartira (also known as M'bicy, Burtira or Isabel Dias; 1497–1580) was the daughter of Tibiriçá, Chief of the Tupiniquim people of Piratininga and other tribes.

Bartira took the name Isabel Dias and married a Portuguese man, João Ramalho, whose settlement became the nucleus of the modern Brazilian city of São Paulo.

She and Ramalho had a number of children who married into prominent Portuguese/Brazilian families.
