= Iguape War =

Brazil-Portuguese war

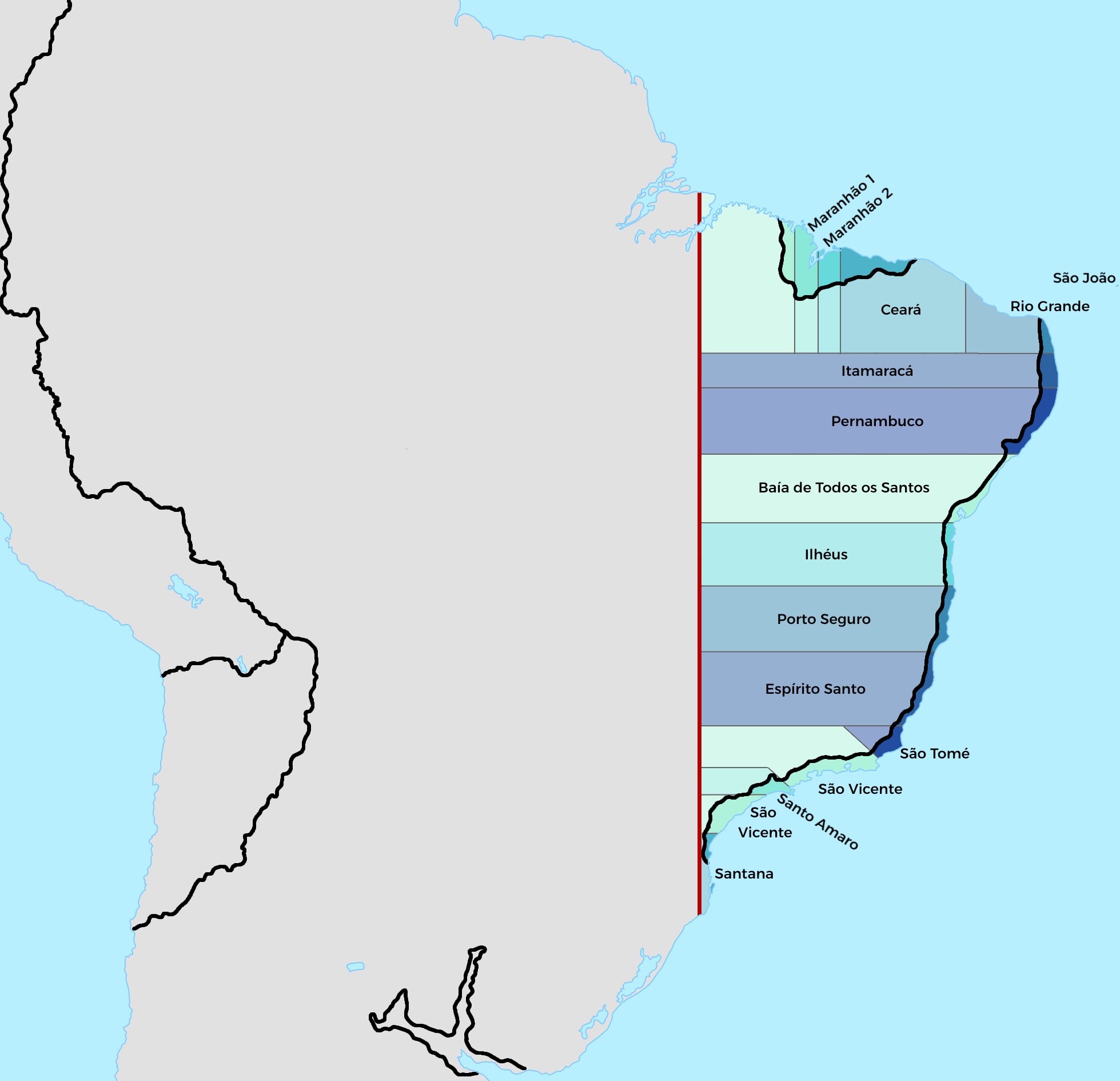
- Brazil in 1534
Date	1534–1536
Location	São Paulo; Colonial Brazil; Kingdom of Portugal
Result	Portuguese victory

Belligerents
Kingdom of Portugal	Spanish Empire; Allied Indigenous tribes

Commanders and leaders
Pero de Goís; Gonçalo Monteiro	(Spanish Empire) Ruy Garcia de Moschera

Strength
80 Portuguese soldiers 1 ship	40 Spanish soldiers 150 Indigenous archers 2 ships

Casualties and losses
Unknown	Unknown

The Iguape War (Portuguese: Guerra de Iguape) occurred during 1534-1536, in the region of São Vicente, São Paulo. Due to the interpretation of the Treaty of Tordesilhas, some Spaniards, led by Ruy Garcia de Moschera, established themselves around Vicentina. They were allied with indigenous Carijós, founded a village (a I-Caa-Para) and won several battles against French corsairs.

When Portuguese forces faced the Spanish contingent, they were promptly defeated. Subsequently, Garcia de Moschera and his followers occupied and looted São Vicente, including carrying away the livro de tombo (parish log). Notwithstanding, after repeated incursions the Portuguese forced the Spanish forces to retreat, first to Ilha de Santa Catarina, and after that to Buenos Aires.

== See also ==
- Entrincheiramento de Iguape
- Cosme Fernandes
