= São Paulo dos Campos de Piratininga =

Village that developed as São Paulo, Brazil

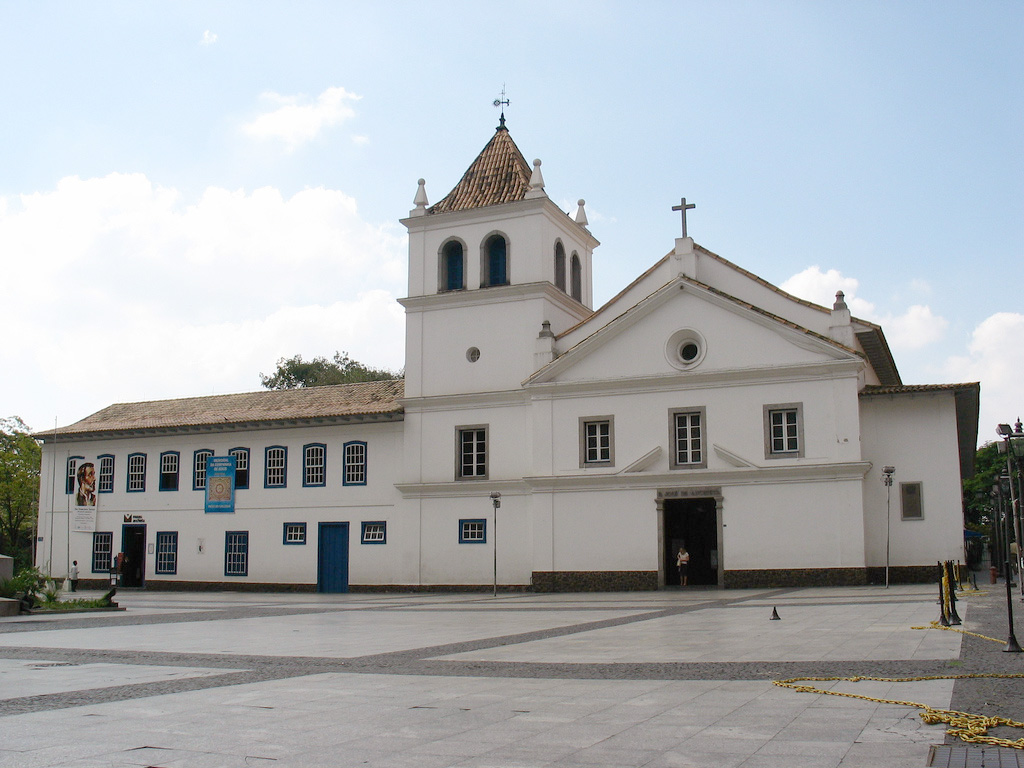
Pátio do Colégio: former Jesuit church and college in the centre of São Paulo. It is a landmark of the foundation of the city.

São Paulo dos Campos de Piratininga (lit. 'Saint Paul of the Fields of Piratininga') was the village that developed as São Paulo, Brazil in the region known as Campos de Piratininga. It was founded as a religious mission and a Jesuit Royal College by priests José de Anchieta and Manuel da Nóbrega on January 25, 1554 (the date of the first mass and the anniversary of Saint Paul's conversion). The village was initially populated by Portuguese colonists and two tribes of the Guaianás Amerindians. Later, São Paulo was the base of the Bandeirantes who explored the interior in search of slaves and gold.

== History ==
Early European colonisation of Brazil was very limited. Portugal was more interested in trade with Africa and Asia. But with English and French privateer ships just off the coast, the Portuguese Crown believed it needed to protect claims to this territory. To share the burden of defence, the Portuguese King João III divided the coast into "captaincies", or swathes of land, 50 leagues apart. He distributed them among wealthy, well-connected Portuguese, hoping that each would take care of his territory. Fearing attacks by the numerous Amerindian tribes, João III discouraged development of the territory's vast interior.

The first coastal settlement in Brazil, São Vicente, was founded in 1532. It was the first permanent Portuguese colony to thrive in the New World. Twenty-two years later the Tibiriçá Chief and Jesuit missionaries Manuel da Nóbrega and José de Anchieta founded the village of São Paulo dos Campos de Piratininga 68 kilometres (42 mi) inland from São Vicente. Their mission village was settled on a plateau between the Tamanduateí and the Anhangabaú rivers. On January 25, 1554 the village was formally founded when the priests celebrated the inaugural mass of the Jesuit school.

Santo André da Borda do Campo was a town founded in 1553 on the same plateau. In 1560, the threat of Indian attack led many colonists to flee from the exposed Santo André da Borda do Campo to the walled Pátio do Colégio in São Paulo dos Campos de Piratininga. Two years later, the Colégio was besieged. Though the Portuguese town survived, fighting took place spasmodically for another three decades.

Located just beyond the Serra do Mar cliffs, above the port city of Santos, and close to the Tietê River, the new settlement became the natural entrance from the South East coast to the vast and fertile high plateau to the West. This eventually developed as the richest Brazilian state.

The inhabitants of São Paulo dos Campos de Piratininga, called Paulistanos, were very poor. Some men started explorations, called Bandeiras, in search of precious metals and stones, runaway slaves, and to capture Amerindians to sell in the domestic slave trade. The men were known as the bandeirantes; they included allied indigenous Brazilians and spoke Língua Geral. In contrast, the priests had established their mission aimed at converting the Tupi–Guarani indigenous Brazilians to the Catholic faith. They tried to acculturate them to Portuguese ways. From the beginning of the colony, the Jesuit goal of evangelising the Amerindians was opposed by many settlers, who used enslaved Amerindians as labourers and profited also from the slave trade in Indians.

The expeditions of the bandeirantes yielded trade, slaves and metals that were important to the developing economy. The Jesuits were often at odds with them for protecting converted natives in their missions. Finally in 1640 the bandeirantes forced the expulsion of the Jesuits from the village. Not until 1653 did the reigning bandeirante Fernão Dias Paes Leme allow Jesuit priests to return.

São Paulo officially became a city in 1711.

== Campos de Piratininga ==
The Campos de Piratininga (Fields of Piratininga in Portuguese) is the relatively flat plains territory at the top of the Serra do Mar just off the cities of Santos and São Vicente in the Brazilian state of São Paulo.

Other cities there are São Bernardo da Borda do Campo, Santo André da Borda do Campo and the rest of the Greater São Paulo. The limit of the Campos de Piratininga on the 700 meters-high coastal wall of the Serra do Mar is called Borda do Campo, or the Border of the Field.

== See also ==
- Portuguese colonization of the Americas
- Colonial Brazil
