= Manuel da Nóbrega =

Portuguese Jesuit priest and missionary

The Reverend Manuel da Nóbrega SJ
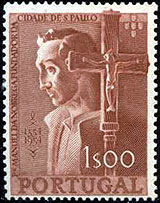
- Father Manuel da Nóbrega on a commemorative Portuguese stamp of the 400th anniversary of the foundation of São Paulo.
- Born: 18 October 1517; Sanfins do Douro, Kingdom of Portugal
- Died: 18 October 1570 (aged 53); Rio de Janeiro, Portuguese Brazil
- Occupations: Jesuit priest, missionary
- Known for: First Provincial of the Society of Jesus in the colony of Brazil. Founder of Recife, Salvador, Rio de Janeiro and São Paulo.

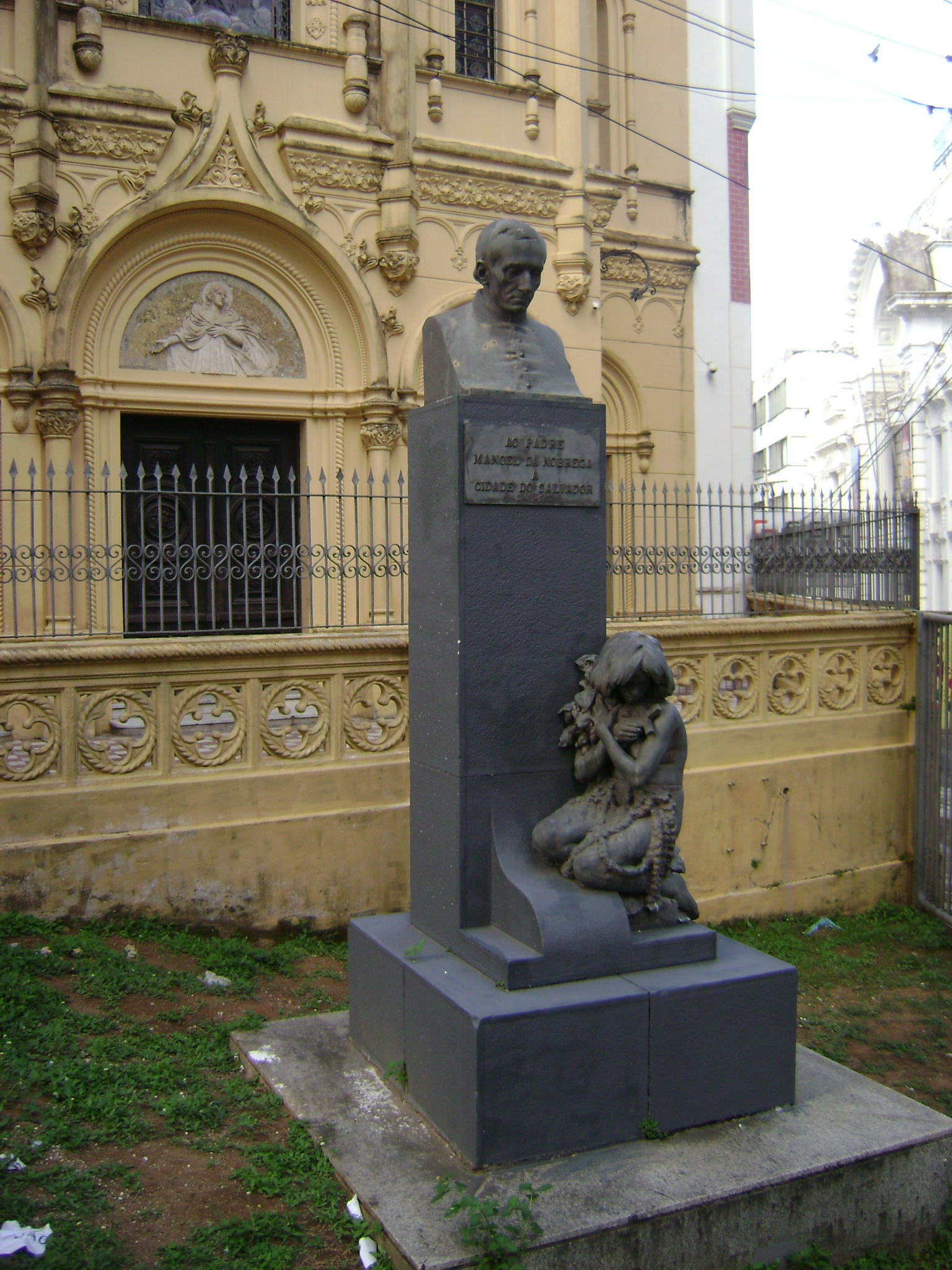
Statue of Manuel da Nóbrega in front of the Chapel of Our Lady of Help, Salvador

Manuel da Nóbrega, SJ (old spelling Manoel da Nóbrega) (18 October 1517 – 18 October 1570) was a Portuguese Jesuit priest and the first provincial of the Society of Jesus in colonial Brazil. Together with José de Anchieta, he was very influential in the early history of Brazil. He participated in the founding of several cities, such as Recife, Salvador, Rio de Janeiro, and São Paulo, as well as many Jesuit colleges and seminaries.

== Early life ==
Nóbrega was born on October 18, 1517, in Sanfins do Douro, Trás-os-Montes e Alto Douro, Portugal, to an important family; his father was Baltasar da Nóbrega, a prominent judge of justice. Manuel da Nobrega studied humanities at Porto and Salamanca, Spain. He then studied at the University of Coimbra, where he obtained his baccalaureate in canon law and philosophy in 1541. He entered the Jesuit novitiate in 1544. After being ordained, he carried out pastoral work in the regions of Entre-Douro-e-Minho and Beira.

== Missionary in Brazil ==
In 1549, he joined the naval fleet of the first Portuguese Governor-General Tomé de Sousa (1502–1579). This followed a request by King John III of Portugal to the Society of Jesus to start the missionary work of converting the Amerindians, who were heathen in the eyes of the Catholic Church, of building churches and religious seminars, and of educating the colonists. Nóbrega lead this first contingent of Jesuits to the New World.

Nóbrega arrived in the captaincy of Bahia on March 29, 1549, accompanied by five other Jesuits. The Governor-General's first actions were to found the colonial capital city of Salvador (The Savior, in Portuguese) and to celebrate its first Mass in 1549.

Nóbrega and his colleagues tried to fulfill their mission but faced many difficulties because the colonists mistreated and tried to enslave the Indians. He soon was fiercely engaged in the defense of the Indians, which led to serious clashes with inhabitants and authorities of the new colony, alike, including the first Governor-General and the one who succeeded him, Duarte da Costa.

To gain authority in his fight against the colonists, Nóbrega asked the King to establish an episcopacy in Brazil, which was granted on February 25, 1551. The first Bishop of Brazil, Dom Pero Fernandes Sardinha took office on June 22, 1552. By then, Nóbrega had already created the Jesuit College of Salvador. Nóbrega was then nominated the first Provincial of the Society of Jesus in the New World, a post that he held until 1559. However, Dom Sardinha was killed and eaten by hostile Indians after a shipwreck, changing Nóbrega's mind about the Indian mission.

Sensing the difficulties of converting adult Indians to Christianity, Nóbrega determined that the Jesuits' efforts should concentrate on the teaching of children, who were more pliable. The Jesuits started to create elementary schools for teaching Portuguese and Latin, basic literacy, and religion. The Jesuits discovered that singing was a very effective way of winning the attention of the students, and Nóbrega was one of the pioneers in using music in education in Brazil. To help the evangelization of children, Nóbrega had the idea of bringing in seven orphan children to Brazil and making them learn Tupi, the language of the Indians, so that they would be bilingual and act as translators. The children would often go with the Jesuits on foot to faraway places and were protected and cherished by the Indians. Several of the children became Jesuit priests, too.

In 1552, Nóbrega again accompanied Tomé de Sousa to the captaincy of São Vicente, in the present-day southern state of São Paulo. There in 1553 he was joined by another group of Jesuits, who had arrived with José de Anchieta, then a young novice, who travelled with Duarte da Costa, the second Governor-General sent by the Crown. Nóbrega determined as the new mission of the small band of missionaries to found villages (aldeamentos) on the high plateau just above the coastline to better pursue their work of catechesis and education of the Indians. Thus, on January 25, 1554, Nóbrega and Anchieta celebrated the first mass in the new and modest Jesuit College of São Paulo dos Campos de Piratininga, in honor of Saint Paul's day of conversion to Christianity. The tiny settlement around this Jesuit school was to become one of the largest metropoles of the world, São Paulo.

== Missionary practice ==
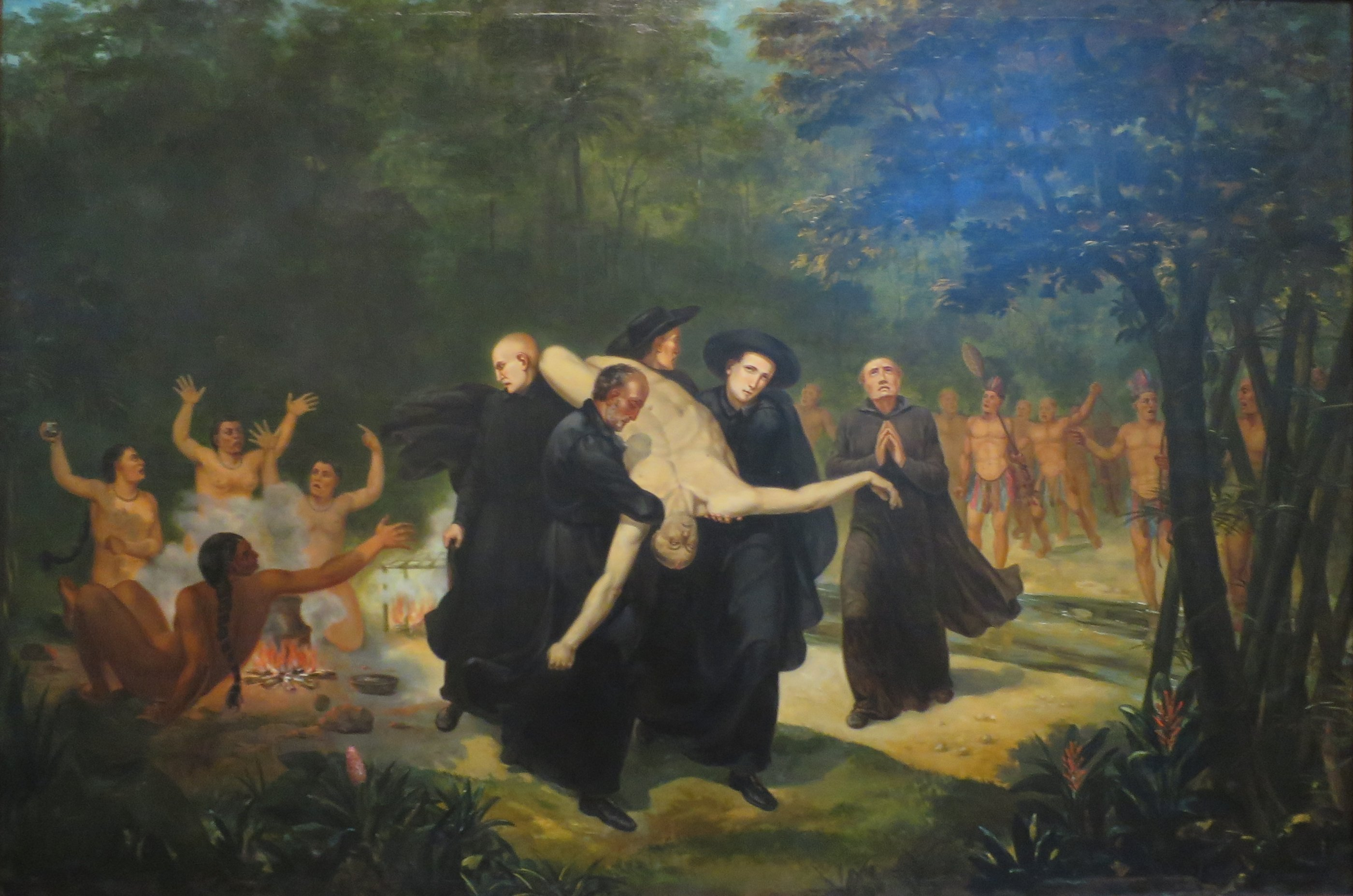
Nóbrega and his companions trying to stop a cannibal feast by Manuel Joaquim Corte Real circa 1843.

Nóbrega and his men began catechizing and baptizing the natives upon their arrival in Brazil. One of the early encounters with members of indigenous groups was when Nóbrega and his men tried to stop preparations for a cannibal feast and the natives rose against the Christians. The Governor's militia helped to defend the missionaries against the native uprising.

Busy building chapels and schools, the missionaries boasted of the high rate of conversion of the natives. The Jesuits had begun teaching prayers to the natives as well as teaching them how to write and sing. According to a report written by Nóbrega, 500 natives had been baptized within the first five months of the arrival of the Jesuits, and many more were catechumens.

Portuguese colonies in Brazil, like many other colonies in the Americas, had problems of slavery and concubinage being common among the new settlers. Nóbrega was concerned that the Portuguese settlers were not good examples. Nóbrega was unable to limit slavery among the Portuguese, so he chose separation instead. He moved toward the physical separation of the natives and the Portuguese to limit their contact with corrupt surroundings and focused on reducing the Jesuits’ reliance on support from the Portuguese crown.

Nóbrega was encouraged that many natives had converted to Christianity despite being mistreated by the Europeans. The Brazilian sugar plantation colony, for example, was founded on the extensive use of Indian labor. Although this stage in the development of the Brazilian economy was temporary, the Portuguese eventually began using African slave labor, it had long-lasting effects on the morale of the native people. The Portuguese had created a society in which the natives had to live by Portuguese rules and conform to new modes of behavior, defined by European social and racial categories.

== Descriptions of natives ==
Nobrega’s Diálogo sobre a Conversão do Gentio uses the point of view of two Portuguese settlers to describe the native people of Brazil. The dialogue between the men provides insight into some of the characterizations of the native population.

Gonçalo Álvares, a lay person preaching to the natives, describes them in the opening lines as "those beasts." He dehumanizes the natives and, at the same time, questions their capacity to understand and accept Christianity. Mateus Nogueira, his companion, agrees and upholds that characterization by stating that those natives are worse than all others in the sense that they do not grasp Christianity. That description is a reflection of Nóbrega’s frustration with the native population.

Later, the two characters discuss the role of a Christian among a native population. Gonçalo questions their goal, and Nogueira clearly states that it is charity and love of God and of neighbor. That last statement places the native peoples, as human beings, among the neighbors whom Christians, including the Portuguese settlers, must love.

Nóbrega questions the importance of converting the natives. On one hand, he is unsure whether they are capable of fully grasping the concept of Christianity, especially with the language barrier. On the other hand, as a Christian and as a Jesuit, he understands his stance must be that of a kind, understanding teacher.

== War and expansion ==
The exploitation and massacres of Indian villages by the Portuguese colonists continued, despite the pacification efforts of Nóbrega. The Tamoio and Tupiniquim tribes, who lived along the Brazilian coast from the present-day states of Espírito Santo to Paraná, were most affected. Rebelling, they formed a warring tribal alliance, which became the Tamoio Confederation (Confederação dos Tamoios, in Portuguese), and started attacks on the villages founded by the colonists. São Paulo was attacked several times, but the Portuguese resisted.

Hard pressed, Nóbrega tried to make a peace treaty with the Confederation, sensing that all their efforts and the Portuguese colonization were in great danger. Under considerable duress and several threats of being killed and eaten by the Indians, Nóbrega and Anchieta stayed for a time in Iperoig (present-day Ubatuba in the northern coast of São Paulo), in conference with the tribal chieftains, until Nóbrega was able to achieve a temporary peace. Anchieta's command of Tupi, the language spoken by most of the Indians (of which he had compiled a vocabulary and a grammar), was extremely useful to Nóbrega, who had no such ability.

The arrival of a French invasion force in 1555, in the Guanabara Bay, Rio de Janeiro (the so-called France Antarctique episode), however, tipped the balance again since the Indians saw an opportunity to rally the Frenchmen's help to vanquish the Portuguese. Thus, Nóbrega had no alternative other than bless and support the punitive expeditions sent by the third Governor-General from Portugal, Mem de Sá, in 1560 and by his nephew, Estácio de Sá, in 1565. The French colonists were defeated and expelled, and their Indian allies were reduced to submission.

After the expulsion of the French invaders, Nóbrega founded a new Jesuit College in Rio, the College of Saint Vincent, and was nominated its rector (dean). In 1570 he was again nominated Brazilian Provincial of the Jesuit Order, but he died before taking office, on October 18, 1570, his 53rd birthday. Seven years later, the Jesuit Provincialship of Brazil was accepted by Anchieta, his great pupil and friend.

== Publications ==
- Dialogues on the Conversion of the Gentile (1554)
- Letters from Brazil (1549-1570)

== Legacy ==
In the 1950s, Brazil issued several postage stamps which showed his image.

== See also ==
- Jesuit Reductions
- São Paulo dos Campos de Piratininga
- Colonial Brazil
- Pátio do Colégio
- Portuguese colonization of the Americas
- José de Anchieta
- Antarctic France

== Bibliography ==
Primary sources

Nóbrega, Manuel da. Diálogo sobre a conversão do gentio. Ed. Soares, Sálvio M. Vol. MetaLibri 2006, v.1.0p.

Nóbrega, Manuel da, S.J., and Leit, Serafim. Cartas. Coimbra Universidade, 1955.

Secondary sources

Cohen, Thomas. “’Who is My Neighbor?’ The Missionary Ideals of Manuel da Nóbrega.” Jesuit Encounters in the New World: Jesuit Chroniclers, Geographers, Educators and Missionaries in the Americas, 1549-1767. Ed. Gagliano, Joseph A., Ronan, Charles E., S.J. Instituto Storico S.I.: Roma, 1997.

Dominan, Helen G. Apostle of Brazil. New York: Exposition Press, 1958.

Domingues, Beatriz Helena. “Comparing Colonial Cultural experiences: Religious Syncretism in Brazil, Mexico and North America.” Revista Electrônica de História do Brasil. V.2. n. 2. Jul/Dec 1998.

Schwartz, Stuart B. Sugar Plantations in the Formation of Brazilian Society: Bahia, 1550-1835. New York: Cambridge University Press, 1985.
