= Amerind =

Amerind or Amerindian may refer to:

- Amerindian or Amerind peoples, a linguistic term for Indigenous peoples of the Americas who are not Inuit, Yupiit, or Unangan/Unangax
  - See: Native American name controversy
- Amerind languages, a hypothetical higher-language family

== See also ==
- Amerind Foundation, a museum and archaeological research center in Arizona
- Genetic history of Indigenous peoples of the Americas
- Paleo-Indians
