= Tupiniquim =

Tupi people of southeastern Brazil

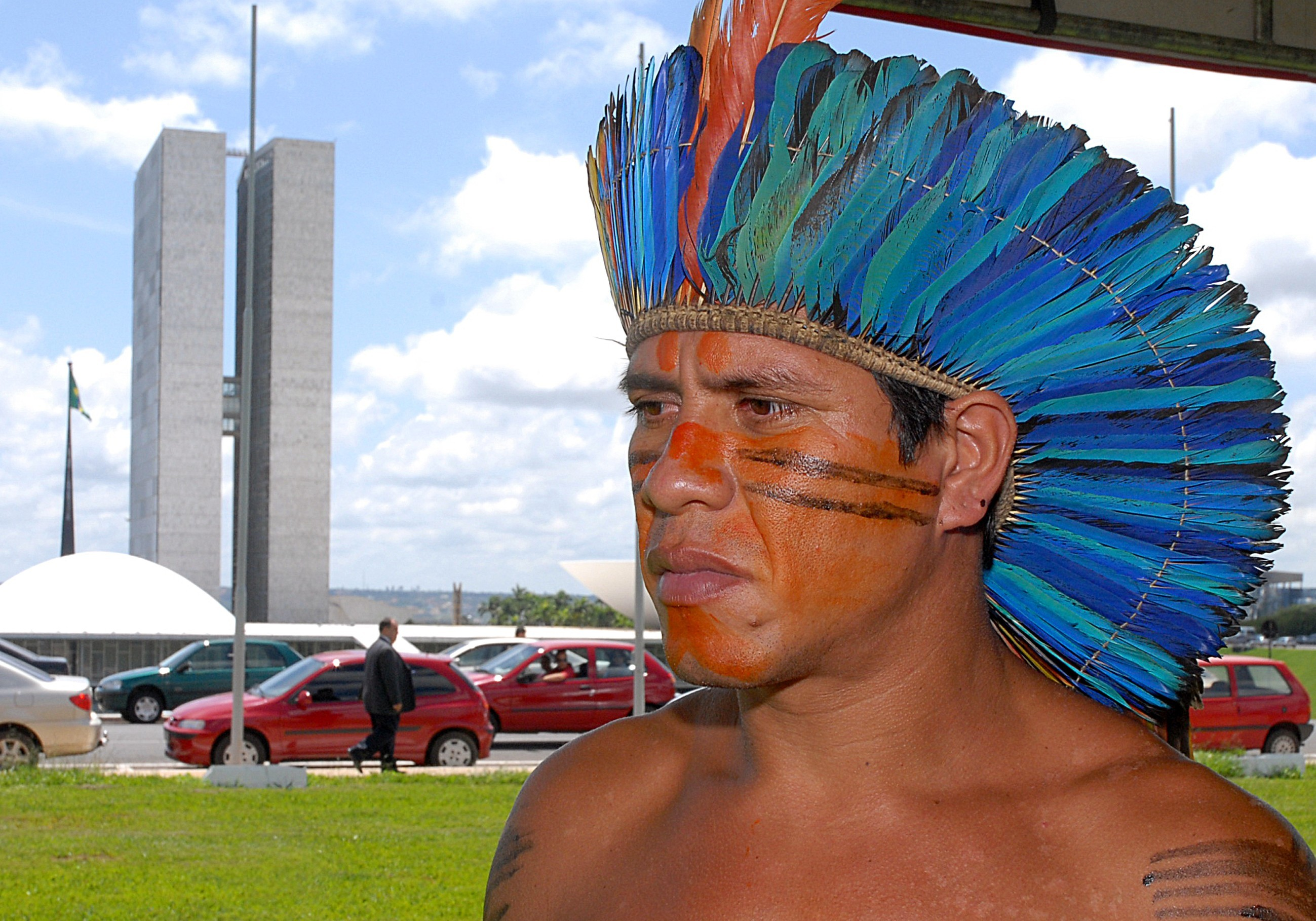
- Jaguarete, Tupiniquim cacique, Brasília, 2007

Total population
- 2,630 (2010)

Regions with significant populations
- Brazil (Espírito Santo)

Languages
- Portuguese (formerly Old Tupi)

Religion
- Christianity (Catholic and Protestant), traditional tribal religion

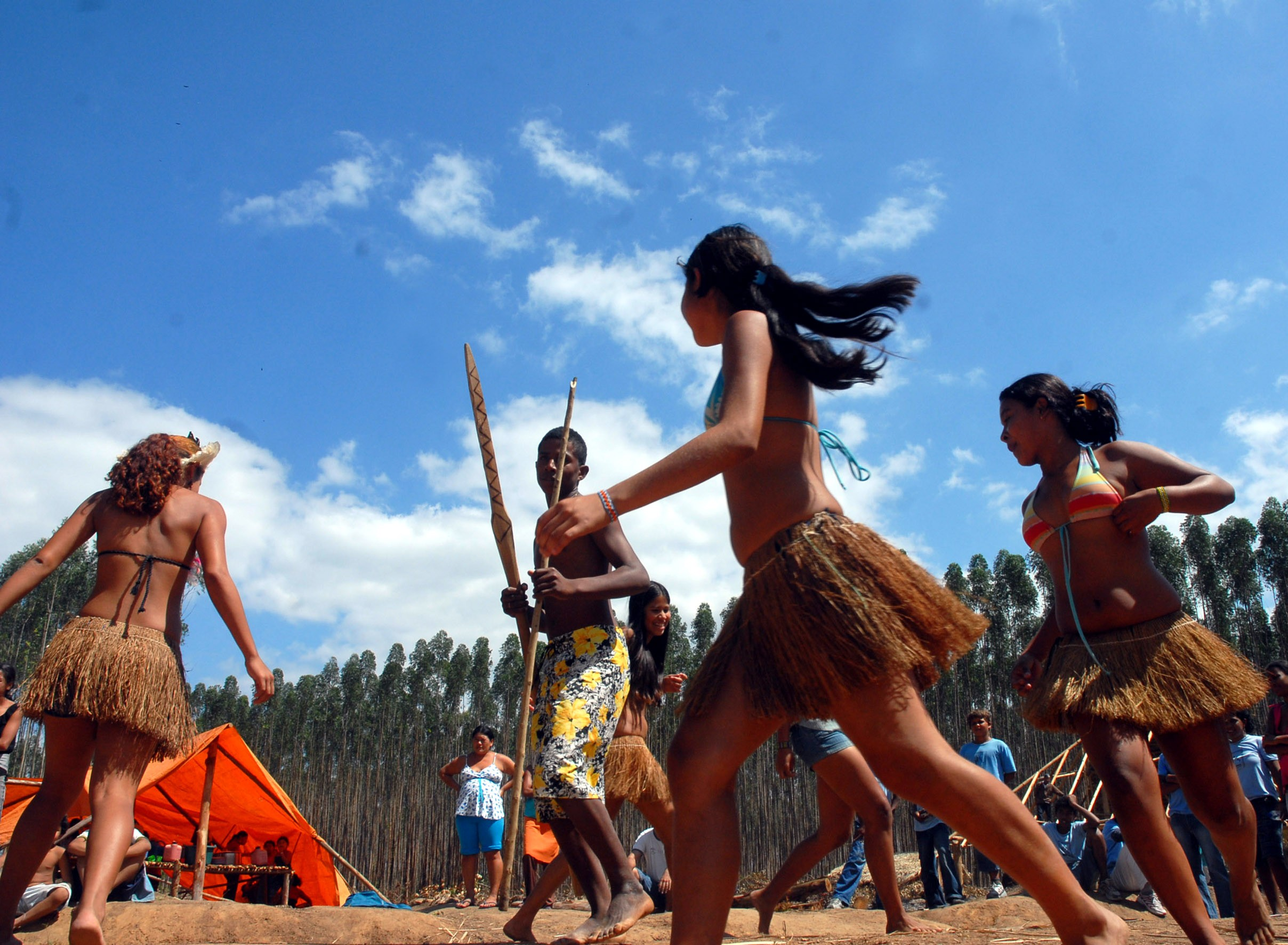
Tupiniquim dance

Tupiniquim (also Tupinã-ki, Topinaquis, Tupinaquis, Tupinanquins, Tupiniquins) are an Indigenous people of Brazil of the Tupi family, who now live in three Indigenous territories (Terras Indígenas in Portuguese). The Indigenous territories (Caieiras Velhas, Pau-Brasil and Comboios) are located near the cities of Santa Cruz and Vila do Riacho in the municipality of Aracruz in northern Espírito Santo state, southeastern Brazil. Caieiras Velhas Indigenous Territory is located along the banks of the Piraquê-Açu River. The Pau-Brasil Indigenous Territory is near Sahy Creek. The Comboios Indigenous Territory is located on the banks of the Comboios River. A 2010 census determined the population of Tupiniquim in all three Indigenous territories as 2,630.

== Territory ==
Historically, the Tupiniquim inhabited a large tract of land along Brazil's coastline from approximately 200 km south of Salvador down to the São Mateus River. This area is north of the present-day Indigenous Territories and extended for about 600 km. The Tupiniquim have inhabited these Indigenous Territories since the founding of Santa Cruz and Nova Almeida (then Reis Magos). During the first two centuries after the arrival of Europeans, Indigenous populations were the predominant majority in both Santa Cruz and Nova Almeida. Their tribe was one of the first to meet the Portuguese in April 1500 at Porto Seguro.

== Etymology and usage of the word ==
The expression Tupin-i-ki means the Tupi next door, side neighbor. Tupinã-ki means a parallel situated tribe or branch of the Tupi.

In Brazil, the term "Tupiniquim" has come to colloquially mean "Brazilian" or "national". The term is used as both a noun and an adjective: cinema tupiniquim (Brazilian cinema), cantor tupiniquim (Brazilian singer), and filosofia tupiniquim (Brazilian philosophy).
