= Brazilian language =

Brazilian language may refer to:

- Brazilian Portuguese, a set of dialects used mostly in Brazil
- Brazilian Sign Language
- Languages of Brazil
- Le langaige du Bresil, a 1540s book of Old Tupi vocabulary
