= History of Tupi =

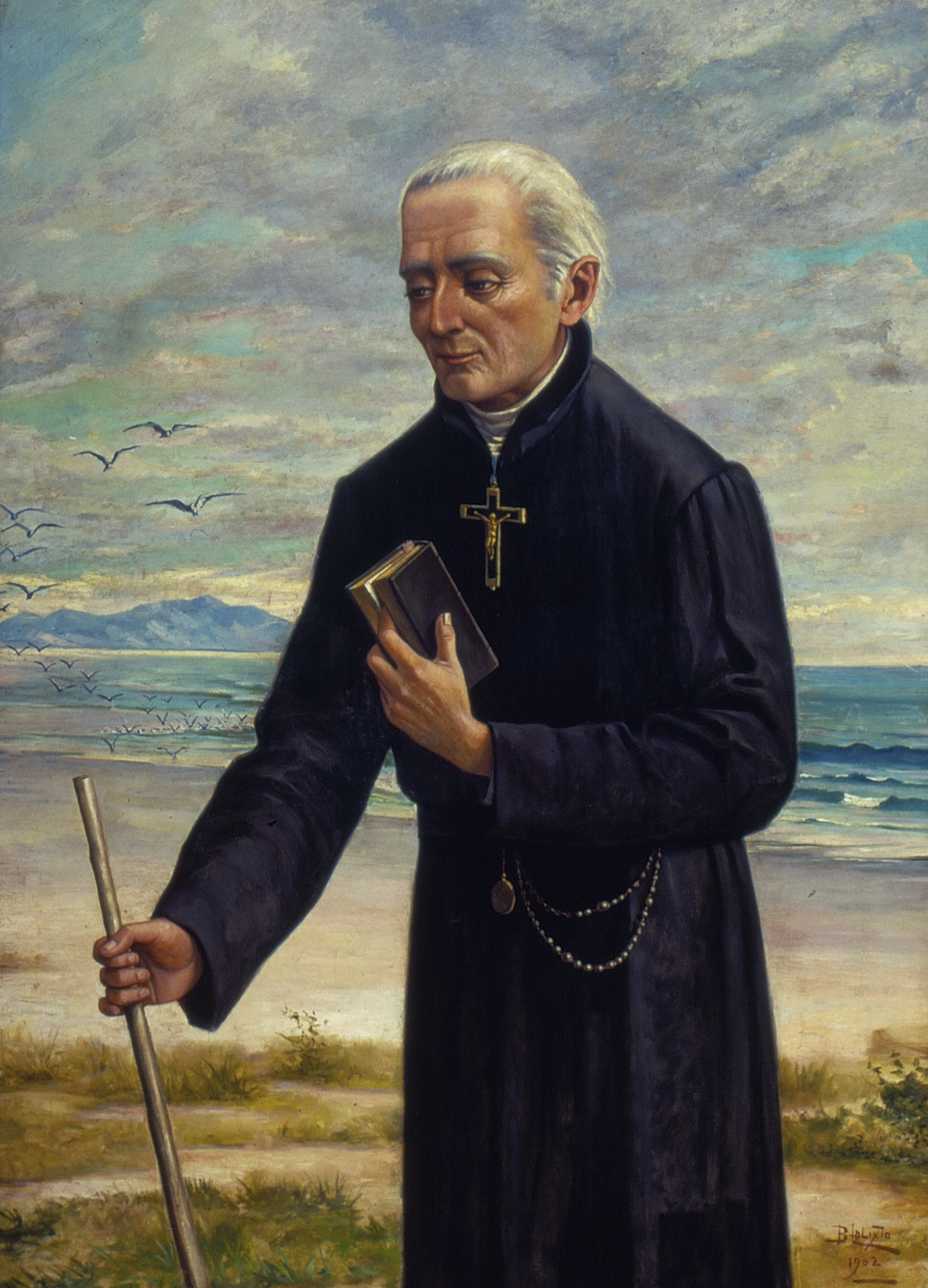
Joseph of Anchieta, the first grammarian of Old Tupi, by Benedito Calixto

During the 16th-century colonization of Brazil, Old Tupi was the predominant language in the coastal regions of the country. Despite some dialectical variations, it became imperative for the fewer colonizers to learn it for territorial conquest. The earliest records of the language date back to the 1510s, but a substantial record was only produced in the 1540s. Jesuits played a crucial role in formalizing its grammar, with Joseph of Anchieta composing a grammar for it in 1555. Through intermarriage, Old Tupi permeated Brazilian society to the extent that even the children of Portuguese spoke it natively. Over time, it gave rise to lingua francas and contributed various words and a distinctive literature to Brazilian Portuguese and its society.

== Beginning of colonization ==
In the 16th century, although hundreds of indigenous languages were spoken in the territory that would later become Brazil, in its coastal region and nearby areas practically the same indigenous language was spoken. This was observed early in colonization, despite the existence of some dialectal variations. According to Pero de Magalhães Gândavo, "The language used along the entire coast is one, although in certain words it may differ in some parts, but not in a way that they cannot understand each other." The Portuguese referred to this language as the "Brasílica language"; nowadays, it is known as Old Tupi. (Note: It is not known by what name native speakers called it.)

It was the language colonizers learned and spoke for a long time, in order to be able to colonize the territory, as their population was much smaller than the indigenous one. The existence of a main language spoken along the coast made it worthwhile to master it. Eduardo de Almeida Navarro argues Old Tupi can, therefore, be considered a classical indigenous language.

=== Early vocabularies ===
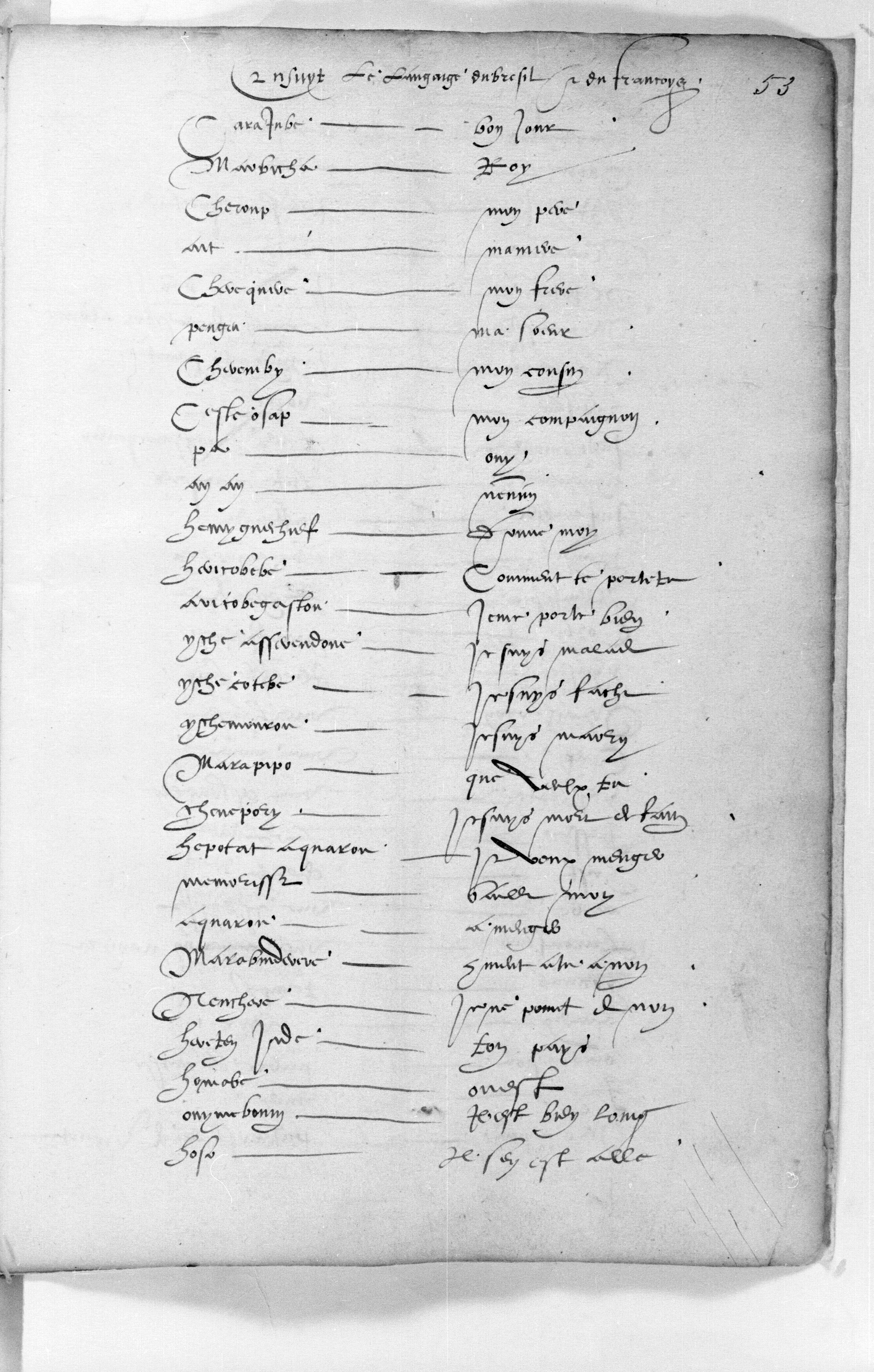
First folio of the oldest substantial record of Old Tupi

Accounts of the discovery of Brazil, from the voyage of Pedro Álvares Cabral in 1500, do not include records of Old Tupi. Some terms of Tupi origin can be found in early Portuguese navigation documents, such as those of the ship Bretoa in 1511, which mention various çagoys or çagoyns (Callitrichidae). The first attempt to compile a list of terms from this language occurred during the circumnavigation voyage of Ferdinand Magellan in 1519; collected in Guanabara Bay by Antonio Pigafetta, the five or six recorded words refer to items Tupinambás traded with Europeans. The oldest substantial record of Old Tupi was produced in the 1540s by a Frenchman named Jehan Lamy. It was also collected in Guanabara Bay and contains 88 entries, although some are repeated.

=== Early grammatical descriptions ===
The first publication containing information on the language's grammar was published in 1578 by the French Calvinist Jean de Léry. He had visited Rio de Janeiro in the mid-1550s and added grammatical explanations as appendix to his travel narrative during the time of Villegaignon's France Antarctique.

== Influence in colonial Brazil ==
In English colonies, settler colonialism was practiced, with entire families migrating, maintaining social and ethnic segregation from the indigenous inhabitants of such locations. In Brazil, however, what occurred was exploitation colonialism. Entire families did not come, but rather men of low social status, exiles, and adventurers, who had to learn the language of the indigenous people in order to be able to deal with them. These men also formed mixed-race families.

In 1546, John III sent to Brazil six Jesuits, including João de Azpilcueta Navarro, the first to learn Old Tupi, alongside the first governor-general of the country, Tomé de Sousa. Azpilcueta Navarro had already translated texts concerning creation and incarnation by 1550. In 1553, Pero Correia emphasized the importance of preparing materials in the indigenous language. That same year, with the arrival of the second governor-general, Duarte da Costa, Joseph of Anchieta came to Brazil, writing the first grammar of the language in 1555, though it would not see publication for another 40 years. (Note: Luís Figueira also published a grammar circa 1628.) By 1566, Marcos Jorge's doctrine had made its way to Brazil and was translated into Old Tupi by Leonardo do Vale. Although catechetical texts in such language flourished, none were printed in the 16th century—in 1592, Jesuits sought permission to print a Christian doctrine and Anchieta's grammar, but only the latter was published, likely due to financial limitations.

To convert the indigenous people, settlements were established, grouping together natives of different nations, protecting them from slavery. To catechize them, a parallel mythology was created, seeking analogies between Portuguese and Old Tupi.

=== Anchieta's Art of Grammar ===
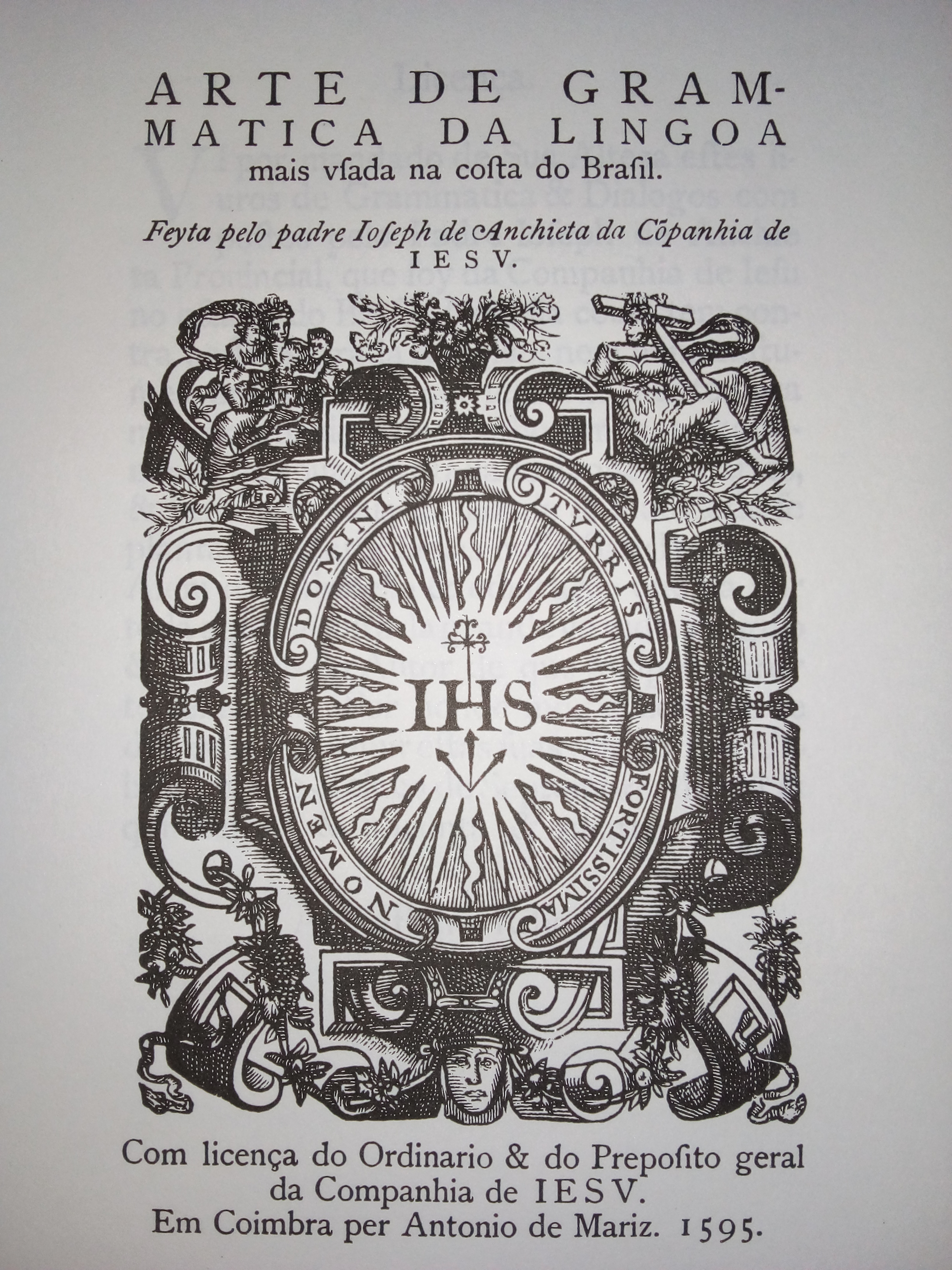
Frontispiece of Anchieta's Art of Grammar

Art of Grammar of the Most Used Language on the Coast of Brazil is the first grammar of a Brazilian indigenous language and the second one of an American indigenous language. It was written by Joseph of Anchieta between 1553 and 1555. During this period, he was unaware of the different forms of Old Tupi spoken in various regions; it is likely Anchieta initially wrote his grammar in the dialect spoken by the Tupi Indians. (Note: The term Tupi acquired a broad sense in the 19th century. Originally, it referred to the 16th-century Tupi–Guarani Indians established on the coast of Santos and São Vicente, as well as along the upper Tietê River. Anchieta referred to them as "Tupis of São Vicente" (also known as Tupiniquins), and their language exhibited some characteristics that distinguished it from that of the "Potiguaras of Paraíba to the Tamoios of Rio de Janeiro".) The grammar was only published in 1595 and, therefore, may have been revised several times after he began living with the Tupinambás. Anchieta's Art of Grammar was translated into German by linguist Julius Platzmann in 1874.

=== Lingua francas ===
Broadly speaking, Old Tupi was spoken until the end of the 17th century, when it lost ground to lingua francas that emerged and were widely spoken in colonial Brazil, on its streets and in homes, even those of the nobility. According to Antônio Vieira, the children of the Portuguese learned the Portuguese language only at school. At least three lingua francas existed in Brazil, with two being the most prominent, namely, the Southern General Language, which disappeared in the early 20th century, and the Amazonian General Language, which gave rise to Nheengatu. (Note: A third was the General Language of Bahia.)

== Cultural legacy ==
Old Tupi is the only indigenous language with a significant presence in the lexicon of the Portuguese spoken in Brazil, as well as in its toponymy and anthroponymy. It also left a legacy in Brazilian literature, such as the lyrical and theatrical poetry of Joseph of Anchieta and the letters of the Camarão Indians.

== Bibliography ==
- Dalby, David; Hair, P. E. H. (November 1966). "'Le langaige du Bresil': a Tupi vocabulary of the 1540s". Transactions of the Philological Society. 65 (1): 42–66. doi:10.1111/j.1467-968X.1966.tb00329.x.
- Drumond, Carlos (1990). "Apresentação" [Presentation]. Arte de gramática da língua mais usada na costa do Brasil (in Portuguese) (7th ed.). São Paulo: Edições Loyola. ISBN 85-15-00171-3.
- Egan, Caroline; Lessa de Sá, Vivien Kogut (2020). "Translation and prolepsis: the Jesuit origins of a Tupi Christian doctrine". In Newson, Linda A. (ed.). Cultural Worlds of the Jesuits in Colonial Latin America. London: University of London Press. ISBN 978-1-908857-75-0. JSTOR j.ctvwrm4h1.
- Ferraz Gerardi, Fabrício (2023). A Role and Reference Grammar Description of Tupinambá. Tübingen Library Publishing. doi:10.15496/publikation-83610. hdl:10900/142263. ISBN 978-3-946552-85-7. Archived from the original on 7 January 2024.
- Garcia, Rodolfo (1942). "Exotismos franceses originários da língua Tupi" [French exoticisms originating from the Tupi language]. Anais da Biblioteca Nacional do Rio de Janeiro (in Portuguese). 64. Archived from the original on 4 June 2023.
- Magalhães, Pablo Antonio Iglesias (2011). "A palavra e o império: a Arte da lingua brasilica e a conquista do Maranhão" [The word and the empire: the Art of the Brasilica Language and the conquest of Maranhão]. Revista de História (in Portuguese) (165): 367–401. doi:10.11606/issn.2316-9141.v0i165p367-401. Archived from the original on 27 February 2023.
- Navarro, Eduardo de Almeida (2005). Método moderno de tupi antigo: a língua do Brasil dos primeiros séculos (in Portuguese) (3rd ed.). São Paulo: Global. ISBN 978-85-260-1058-1.
- Navarro, Eduardo de Almeida (2013). Dicionário de tupi antigo: a língua indígena clássica do Brasil [Dictionary of Old Tupi: the classical indigenous language of Brazil] (in Portuguese) (1st ed.). São Paulo: Global. ISBN 978-85-260-1933-1.
- Navarro, Eduardo de Almeida (2022). A Era das Gramáticas: a questão das línguas na época do Renascimento e das Grandes Navegações [The Age of Grammars: the question of languages in the time of the Renaissance and the Great Navigations] (PDF) (in Portuguese). Campinas: Pontes Editores. ISBN 978-65-5637-630-1. Archived (PDF) from the original on 10 January 2024.
- Navarro, Eduardo de Almeida; Tessuto Júnior, Edgard (May 2016). "Breve história da língua tupi" [Brief history of the Tupi language]. Revista Metalinguagens (in Portuguese). 3 (1). ISSN 2358-2790. Archived from the original on 3 January 2024.
- Pereira, Paulo Roberto (2006). "Do bom selvagem ao bárbaro canibal" [From the noble savage to the cannibal barbarian]. Revista Brasileira (in Portuguese) (46). Archived from the original on 19 December 2023.
- Rodrigues, Aryon Dall'Igna (June 1995). "O nome Curitiba" [The name Curitiba] (PDF). Boletim Informativo da Casa Romário Martins (in Portuguese). 21 (105). Archived (PDF) from the original on 5 February 2024.
- Rodrigues, Aryon D. (1997). "Descripción del tupinambá en el período colonial: el Arte de José de Anchieta" [Description of the Tupinambá in the colonial period: the Art of Joseph of Anchieta] (PDF). In Zimmermann, Klaus (ed.). La descripción de las lenguas amerindias en la época colonial (in Spanish). Madrid: Iberoamericana. ISBN 84-88906-74-9. ISSN 0067-8015.
- Rodrigues, Aryon Dall'Igna (September 2000). "Breve história da língua dos índios vistos por Cabral" [Brief history of the language of the Indians seen by Cabral] (PDF). Universa (in Portuguese). 8 (3). Brasília. Archived (PDF) from the original on 3 January 2024.
