= Língua geral dos índios das Américas =

18th-century Paulista General Language vocabulary

- National Library of Brazil
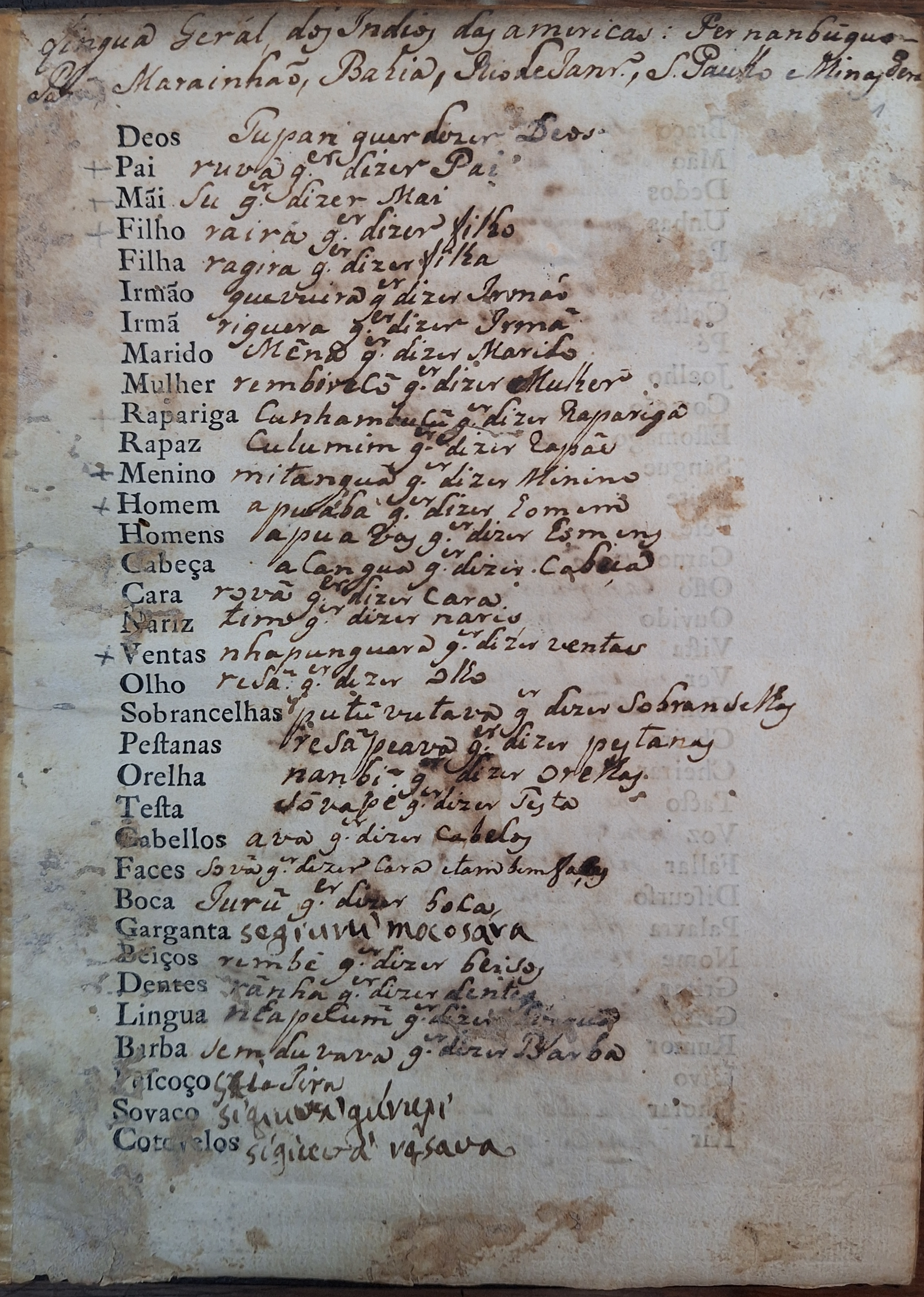
- First page of the vocabulary
- Type: Vocabulary
- Date: 18th century
- Language(s): Portuguese and the Paulista General Language
- Condition: Worn and stained
- Contents: 440 entries
- Additions: Pencil corrections
- Previously kept: Camilo Castelo Branco
- Discovered: 2001
- Accession: 10,01,010
- The full text of Língua geral dos índios das Américas at Wikisource

Língua geral dos índios das Américas (lit. 'general language of the Indians of the Americas') is an anonymous, undated manuscript, likely from the 18th century, that contains a Tupi vocabulary. It is one of the very few known records of the Paulista General Language and is housed at the National Library of Brazil. The manuscript was discovered in 2001 by Aryon Rodrigues and Ruth Monserrat.

The Portuguese terms are printed on the left side, with their Tupi translations handwritten on the right, followed by the Portuguese equivalents again, this time handwritten as well. The terms cover a wide range of lexical fields. There is evidence suggesting the document may have passed from Lusophone to Francophone hands. The manuscript is worn and stained, making it sometimes difficult to read.

Its size suggests it was intended for missionaries, who may have communicated with only a fragmented understanding of the language, which implies interactions took place through a pidgin. The text displays numerous features of the Paulista General Language, as well as influences of Portuguese on the Tupi language.

== History ==
Without any indication of author or date, but likely from the 18th century, the document once belonged to Camilo Castelo Branco. The final phrase of the vocabulary, "dans leur langue", also suggests one of the later owners of the document had French as a reference language. It features a combination of printed text and handwritten annotations, and it is speculated the list was printed at one of the presses in Lisbon, Coimbra, or Porto, and subsequently distributed to missionaries prior to their departure for the Americas, Asia, or Africa.

Língua geral dos índios das Américas was first presented in 2001 by Aryon Rodrigues and Ruth Monserrat in a talk given at the II Colóquio sobre Línguas Gerais; the title of the presentation was "Um novo antigo documento da Língua Geral Paulista". The document is housed in the manuscript section of the National Library of Brazil, catalogued under the number 10,01,010.

== Structure ==
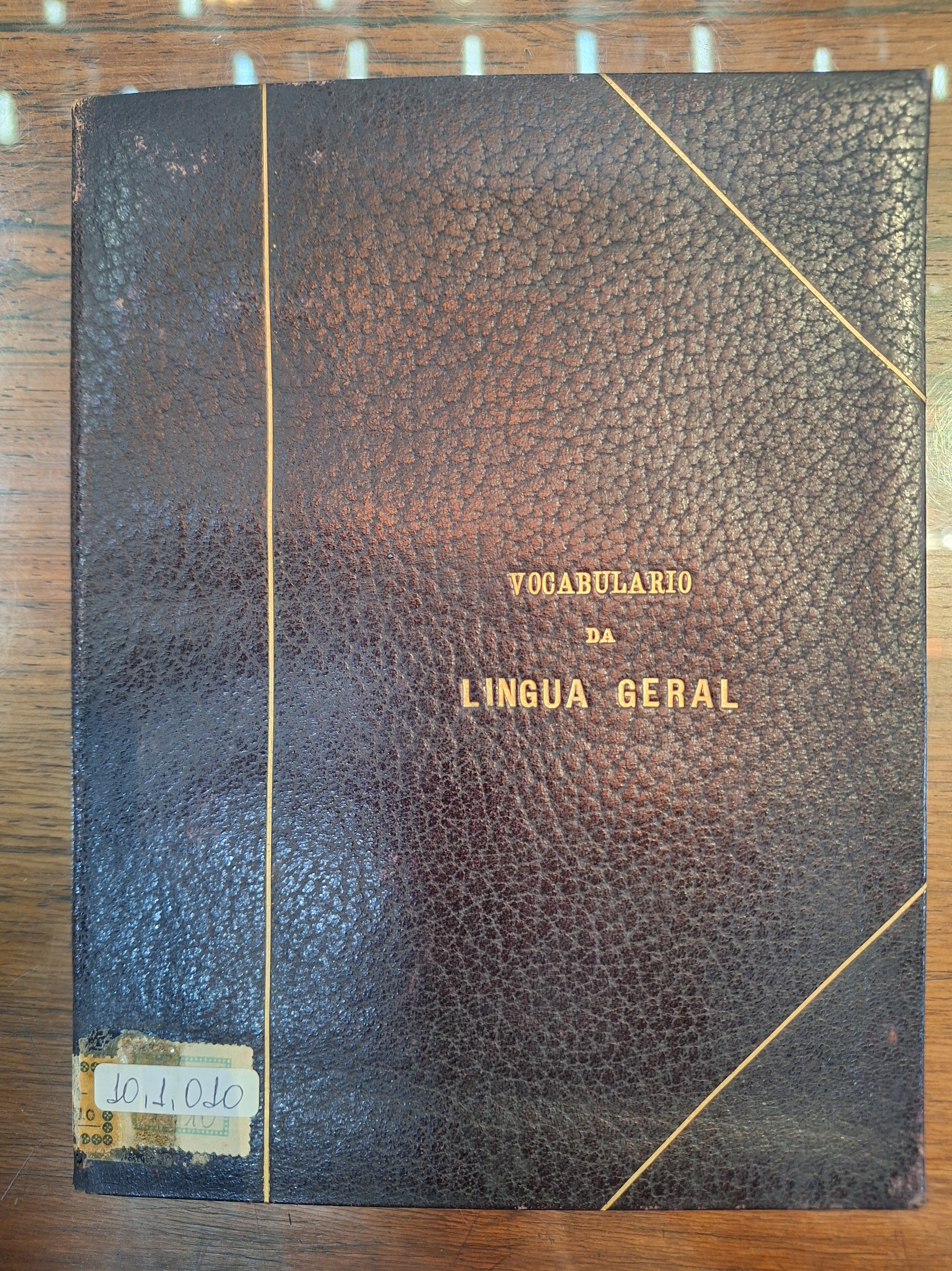
Leather binding

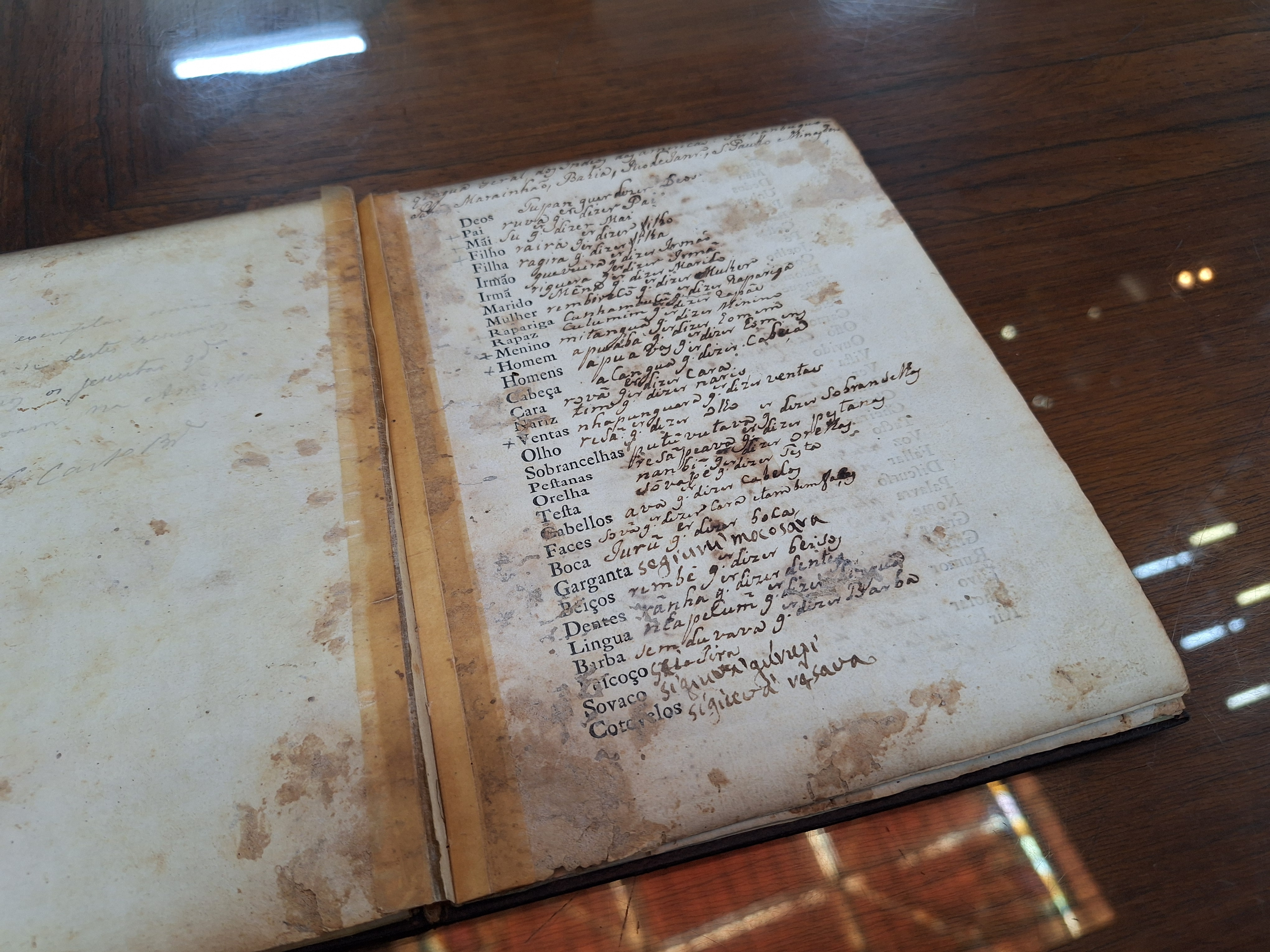
First page

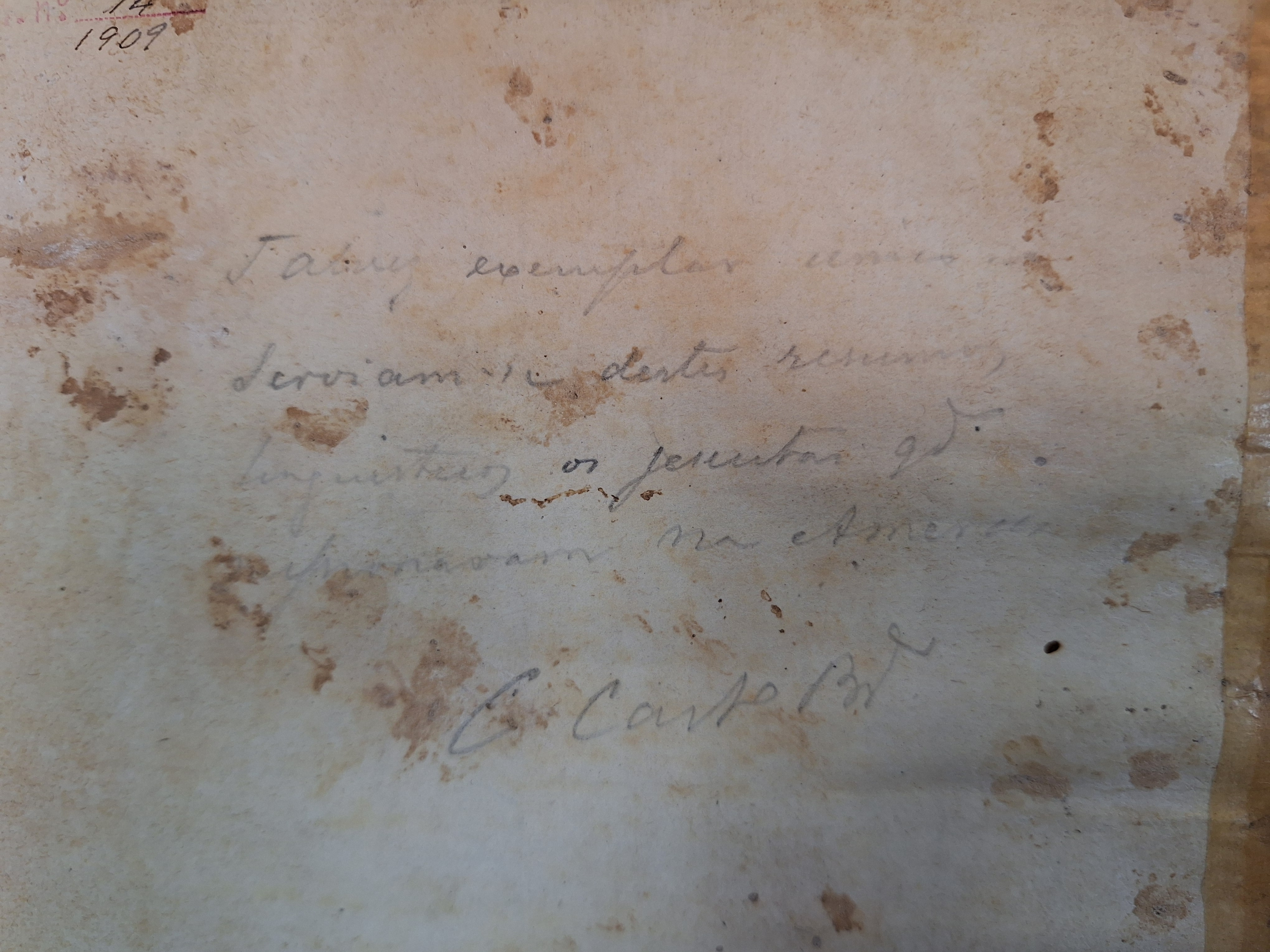
Annotated back cover

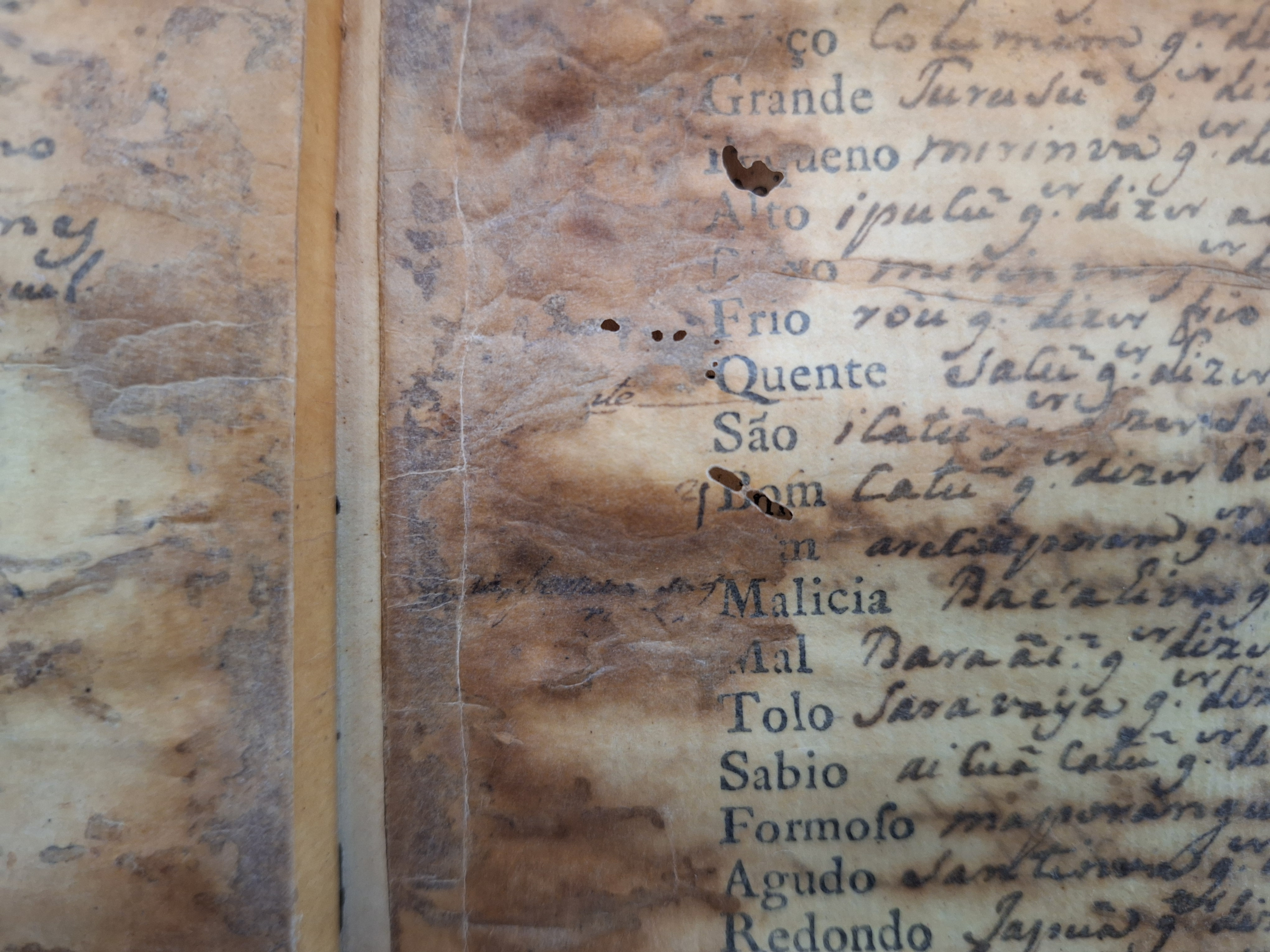
Worn and stained page

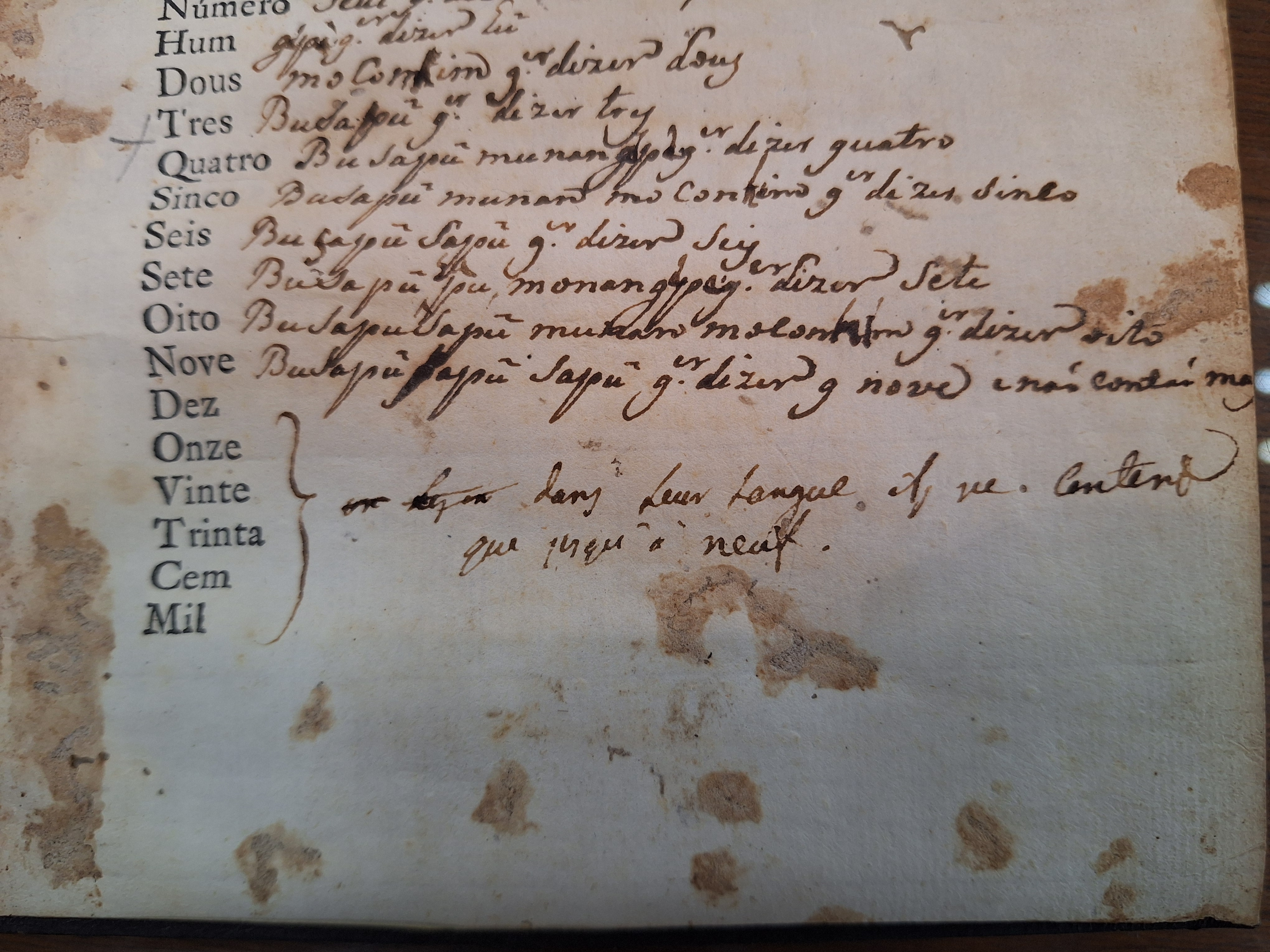
French-annotated last page

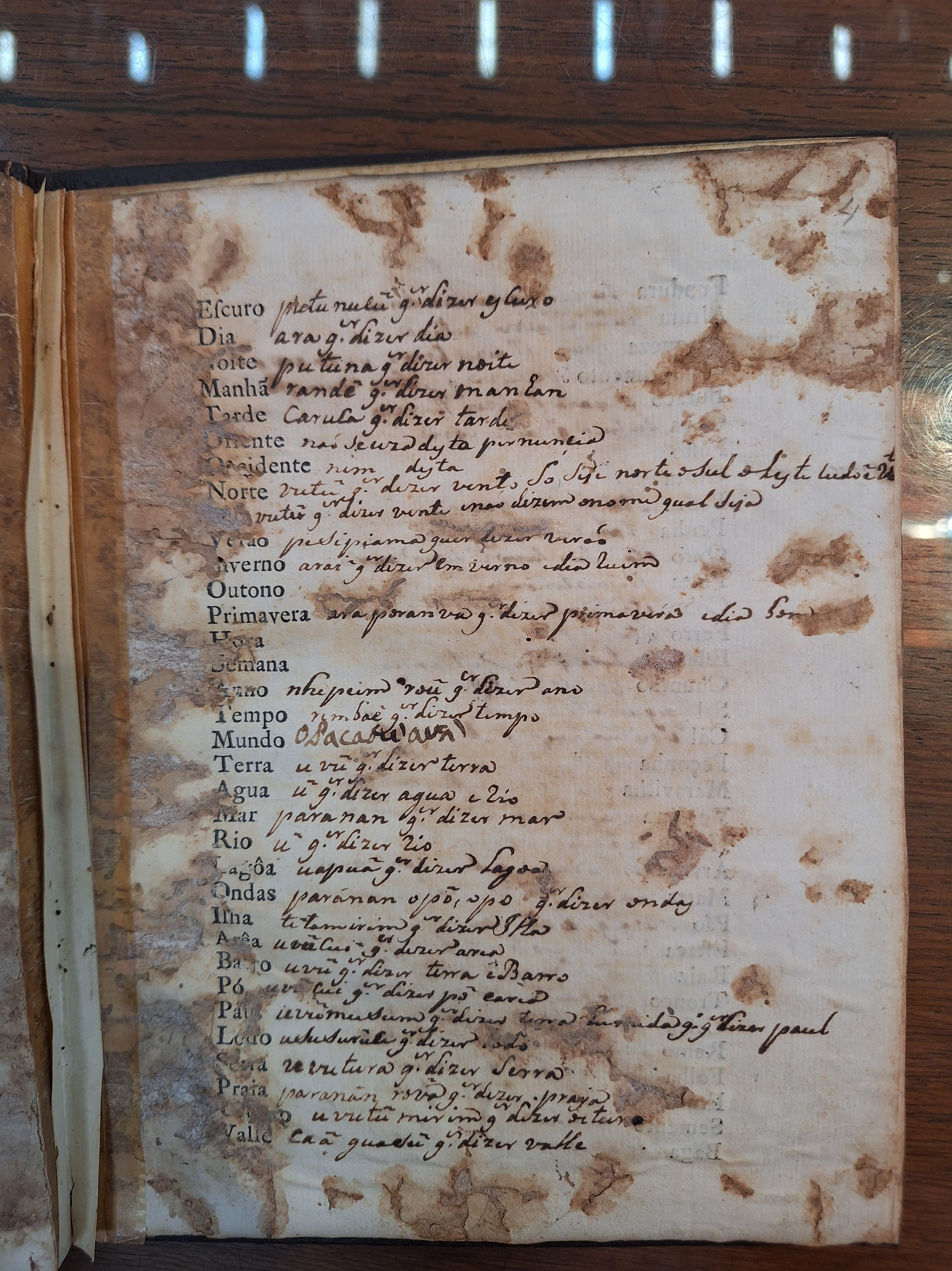
Middle page

The document is bound in leather, bearing the title "Vocabulário da língua geral" on its cover, and at the top of the first page, the heading "Língua geral dos índios das Américas". The vocabulary comprises seven unnumbered leaves and contains 440 entries in Portuguese. The Portuguese terms are printed on the left-hand side, (Note: It is the only printed part; all the rest is handwritten.) while on the right, the equivalent terms in Tupi are handwritten, followed by their also handwritten Portuguese translations. For all entries with a Tupi equivalent, the scribe writes the term in Tupi and then the phrase "quer dizer", followed by the Portuguese translation. (Note: Only in the first entry is "quer dizer" written out in full; in the others, it appears simply as "q.^{er} dizer".) At the end of the final page, there is a note in French, written in a handwriting distinct from that used in the rest of the manuscript: "dans leur langue ils ne content / que jusqu'a' neuf", (Note: Literally, "in their language they count only up to nine". In Old Tupi proper, counting went only up to four, with translations for "four" being rarely used.) suggesting the document at some point passed from Lusophone to Francophone hands. Its contents range across various lexical fields, including terms related to genealogy, human anatomy, physical and emotional sensations, marital status, action verbs, names of animals, personal pronouns, and means of transportation.

- Deos – Tupan quer dizer Deos
- Pai – ruva q.^{er} dizer Pai
- Mãi – ſu q.^{er} dizer Mai

The manuscript exhibits several deficiencies; it is worn and stained, rendering some sections illegible, while the remaining portions are at times difficult to read. Additionally, there are pencil insertions and corrections in a handwriting distinct from that of the original scribe. Furthermore, certain Portuguese words lack a corresponding translation into Tupi. On the inside back cover, a nearly faded inscription can be found, reading: "Talvez exemplar unico / serviam-se destes resumos / linguisticos os jesuitas qdo / pregavam na America / C. Cast. Br." (Note: Literally, "Perhaps unique copy. Jesuits served themselves with these linguistic summaries when preaching in America. C. Cast. Br.")

== Analysis ==
The document's small size makes it well-suited for being carried in a pocket or travel bag, indicating it was likely intended for missionaries. These individuals would befriend local informants, who would in turn assist them in filling in the right-hand column with terms from the local language. The blank space above the column of terms on the first page suggests it was left intentionally for the name of the language under study to be noted there. Users of this word list who had only limited contact with native speakers likely developed a fragmented understanding of the language, implying communication may have occurred through a pidgin, similar to the vocabularies used during the early colonial period.

=== Language ===
The vocabulary is one of the very few known records of the Paulista General Language, displaying many features characteristic of it. One such feature is the use of the letter "v" in several Tupi words where Jesuit vocabularies would use "b", as in avati ("rye, corn, wheat"). Additionally, there is evidence of the phonological evolution of /ɨ/ to /u/, as seen in uvû ("land", corresponding to yby in Old Tupi) and vutû ("wind", corresponding to ybytu in Old Tupi). It also reflects the influence of Portuguese, as demonstrated by entries such as aivenser ("victory", from the Portuguese vencer), cavarâ ("goat", from cabra), cavarû ("horse", from cavalo), caranderû ("sheep", from carneiro), rea ("king", from rei ), sapatû ("shoe", from sapato), sevorâ ("onion", from cebola), and xecambarara ("friend", from camarada).

== See also ==
- Le langaige du Bresil

== Bibliography ==
- Lee, M. Kittiya (2005). Conversing in Colony: The Brasílica and the Vulgar in Portuguese America, 1500–1759. Baltimore: The Johns Hopkins University. Archived from the original on 27 March 2025.
- Leite, Fabiana Raquel (2013). A Língua Geral Paulista e o "Vocabulário Elementar da Língua Geral Brasílica" [The Paulista General Language and the "Elementary Vocabulary of the Brasílica General Language"] (in Portuguese). Campinas: Universidade Estadual de Campinas. doi:10.47749/T/UNICAMP.2013.920777. Archived from the original on 4 October 2024.
- Lemos Barbosa, Antônio (1956). Curso de tupi antigo: gramática, exercícios, textos [Course of Old Tupi: grammar, exercises, texts] (in Portuguese). Rio de Janeiro: Livraria São José. Archived from the original on 12 June 2025.
