= Thomas Cavendish =

English privateer (1560–1592)

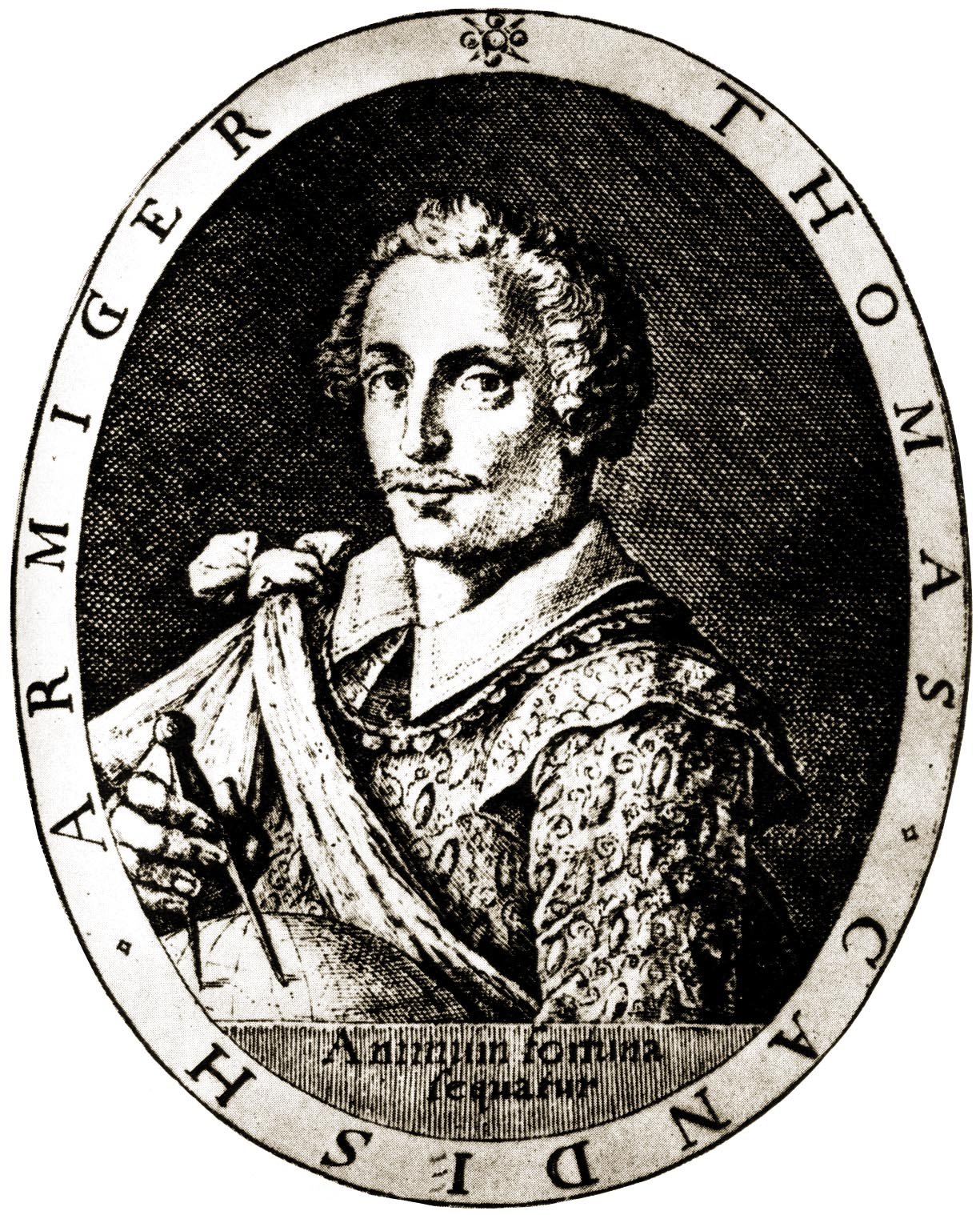
An engraving from Henry Holland's Herōologia Anglica (1620). Animum fortuna sequatur is Latin for "May fortune follow courage."

Sir Thomas Cavendish (1560 – May 1592) was an English explorer and privateer known as "The Navigator" because he was the first to deliberately attempt to emulate Sir Francis Drake, raiding Spanish towns and ships in the Pacific and then returning by circumnavigating the globe. Though Magellan-Elcano, Loaísa, Drake, and Loyola had all preceded him in circumnavigating the globe, Cavendish's own successful voyage, between 1586 and 1588, was the first deliberately planned circumnavigation. It made him rich from captured Spanish gold, silk, and treasure from the Pacific and the Philippines, with his richest prize being the 600-ton Manila galleon Santa Ana (also called Santa Anna). He was knighted by Queen Elizabeth I of England after his return. He later set out for a second raid and circumnavigation but was not as fortunate and died at sea in 1592, at the age of 31.

== Early life ==
Cavendish was baptized on 19 September 1560 in St Martin's Church, Trimley St Martin, Suffolk. He was the third son of William Cavendish and Mary Wentworth. When his father died in 1572, Cavendish inherited a sizeable estate and was placed under the guardianship of Thomas Wentworth, 2nd Baron Wentworth. Wentworth was required to ensure that the boy was prepared for a university education.

In the spring of 1576 at the age of 15, he entered Corpus Christi College, Cambridge but left in November 1577 without taking a degree. He then entered Gray's Inn, London, and for the next several years maintained a lavish lifestyle, making connections in London society including the royal court. He also came to know Richard Hakluyt and others in his circle who were advocating for the English colonization of North America. Cavendish gained a reputation as a spendthrift and between 1583 and 1585 he was taken to court for non-payment of debts.

== Roanoke Colony ==
In the 1580s, Cavendish looked for advancement under the patronage of Walter Raleigh. Raleigh and the Earl of Pembroke helped Cavendish to become a member of parliament representing the borough of Shaftesbury in 1584. In turn, he supported Raleigh's efforts to assume Humphrey Gilbert's contract to colonize America. Cavendish also studied navigation under the direction of Thomas Harriot at Raleigh's Durham House in Westminster.

In 1585, Cavendish was appointed second-in-command to Richard Grenville on an expedition to establish Roanoke Colony in Virginia. He invested in the purchase and provisioning of the fleet that left Plymouth on 9 April 1585. The ships were scattered by a fierce storm but Cavendish's ship, Elizabeth, survived and reached the rendezvous point in Puerto Rico. Grenville was impressed with the navigational skills displayed by Cavendish on his first voyage.

Grenville and Cavendish spent several weeks in the Caribbean gathering supplies for the new colony. They were able to purchase supplies from the Spanish on Hispaniola and also seized two Spanish ships that they encountered along the way. In late June they reached the Outer Banks in present-day North Carolina, where the Roanoke colony was established.

Cavendish returned to England in August aboard the Tyger without profit from his investments but he did gain important experience and several close friends.

== First voyage: a successful westbound circumnavigation ==
By July 1586, Spain and England had become embroiled in the Anglo–Spanish War, which would culminate with the Spanish Armada and its threatened invasion of England in 1588. Cavendish determined to follow Sir Francis Drake by raiding the Spanish ports and ships in the Pacific and circumnavigating the globe. After getting permission for his proposed raids, Cavendish built a 120-ton sailing ship with eighteen cannons, named the Desire. He was joined by the sixty-ton, ten-gun ship Content and the forty-ton ship Hugh Gallant.

=== Departure and Atlantic crossing ===
Thomas Cavendish with his three ships and 123 men set out from Plymouth, England on 21 July 1586.

He anchored first at the island of Santa Magdalena near Punta Arenas, in the Strait of Magellan. There, in two hours, they killed and salted two barrels full of penguins for food. After extensive exploration of the many inlets, labyrinths, and intricate channels of the islands and broken lands of Tierra del Fuego and its environs they emerged from the strait into the Pacific on 24 February and sailed up the coast of South America.

=== Exploring and raiding off the west coast of South America ===
There on the Pacific coast he sank or captured nine Spanish ships and looted several towns of quantities of fresh food, supplies and treasure while intentionally sinking the ship Hugh Gallant to use her crew to replace crew members lost on his other ships. According to Hakluyt's 'Voyages' he raided an island on the coast of Ecuador (probably Isla Puna) but was repulsed with loss by local forces.

=== Capturing a Manila galleon ===
A pilot from one of the captured Spanish ships revealed that a Manila galleon was expected in October or November 1587 and usually stopped at Cape San Lucas on the Baja California peninsula before going on to Acapulco. The Manila galleons were restricted by the Spanish Monarch to one or two ships/year and typically carried all the goods accumulated in the Philippines in a year's worth of trading silver, from the Mints in Peru and Mexico, with the Chinese and others, for spices, silk, gold and other expensive goods. In 1587 there were two Manila galleons: the San Francisco and the Santa Ana. Unfortunately both encountered a typhoon on leaving the Philippines and were wrecked on the coast of Japan. Only the Santa Ana was salvageable and after repairs resumed her voyage.

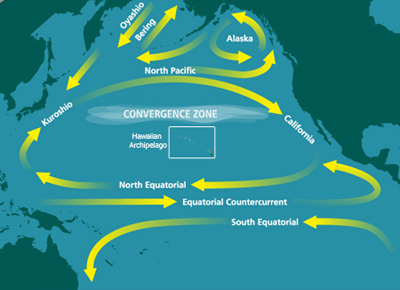
The North Pacific currents and winds used by both the Manila Galleon and Cavendish to get to Guam and the Philippines – the North Pacific Gyre

Upon reaching the Gulf of California in October 1587 Cavendish and his two ships put in at an island above Mazatlan where they careened their ships to clean their bottoms and made general repairs. They had to dig wells for water. They sailed for Cape San Lucas on the Baja Peninsula and set up patrols to see if they could spot the Manila galleon. Early on 4 November 1587 one of Cavendish's lookouts spotted the 600-ton galleon manned with over 200 men. After a several hour chase the English ships overhauled the Santa Ana—which conveniently had no cannons on board, in order to carry the added cargo. After several hours of battle during which Cavendish used his cannon to fire ball and grape shot into the galleon while the Spanish tried to fight back with small arms, the Santa Ana, now starting to sink, finally struck her colours and surrendered.

Because of the great disparity in size the Content and Desire had to pick and choose what rich cargo they wanted to transfer to their ships from the much larger Santa Ana. One hundred and ninety Spaniards (including Sebastián Vizcaíno, later explorer of the California coast), and Filipino crewmen, were set ashore with food and some weapons in a location where they had water and food available. Cavendish kept with him two Japanese sailors (known as Christopher and Cosmas), three boys from Manila, a Portuguese traveller familiar with China and a Spanish pilot (navigator). They loaded all the gold (about 100 troy pounds/37.3 kilograms or 122,000 pesos worth) and then picked through the silks, damasks, musks (used in perfume manufacture), spices, wines, and ship's supplies for what they could carry. Some in Mexico claimed that the total value of the cargo was about 2,000,000 pesos/50 tonnes of silver. After setting fire to the Santa Ana, the Desire and Content sailed away on 17 November 1587 to begin their voyage across the Pacific Ocean.

While burning, the Santa Ana drifted onto the coast where the Spanish survivors extinguished the flames, re-floated the ship and limped into Acapulco.

The Content was never heard from again. The Desire tried to avoid conflict for the rest of her voyage.

=== Crossing the Pacific Ocean and exploring the islands of South East Asia ===
After crossing the Pacific Ocean, Cavendish and the Desire arrived at the island of Guam on 3 January 1588. There he traded iron tools for fresh supplies, water and wood, supplied by the natives. On further landings in the Philippines, Java and other islands, he traded some of his captured linen and other goods for fresh supplies, water and wood, and collected information about the Chinese and Japanese coasts. He hoped to use this information to augment existing English knowledge of the area and for a possible second voyage. His crew of about 48 men replaced their worn out clothing and bedding with uniforms made out of silken damask.

Cavendish attacked Arevalo, the capital of the Spanish settlement in Iloilo at the time in 1587 with the raid giving the town the distinction of being the first Spanish settlement in the Philippines to be attacked by a British pirate. It was also the first recorded British incursion into Philippine waters.

=== Return to England ===
By 14 May 1588 Cavendish reached the coast of Africa and returned to England by way of the Cape of Good Hope, stopping at the island of Saint Helena for supplies.

On 9 September 1588 the Desire sailed into the harbour at Plymouth, England. Later she paraded up the River Thames through London, displaying her new sails of blue damask.

Cavendish's first voyage was a huge success both financially and otherwise; Cavendish was not yet 28 at his return. The circumnavigation of the globe had been completed in two years and 49 days, nine months faster than Drake, although, like Drake, Cavendish returned with only one of his ships—the Desire with a crew of about 48 men. He was knighted by Queen Elizabeth I of England, who was invited to a dinner aboard the Desire. England celebrated both the return of the Desire and the defeat of the Spanish Armada earlier that year.

== Second voyage and death ==
Cavendish sailed on a second expedition in August 1591, accompanied by the navigator John Davis. They went further south to the Strait of Magellan and then returned to Brazil, where they hid and reprovisioned in Ilhabela and looted Santos and São Vicente for two months. In early 1592, he tried to again loot Santos and São Vicente, but he was repelled, losing three of his five ships. He was further repelled at São Sebastião and Ilha Grande.

Going further north, they lost most of the crew in a battle against the Portuguese at the village of Vitória, today the capital of the State of Espirito Santo. One abandoned sailor, Anthony Knivet, later wrote about his adventures in Brazil. Cavendish set off across the Atlantic towards Saint Helena with the remainder of the crew, but died of unknown causes at age 31, possibly off Ascension Island in the South Atlantic in 1592. The last letter of Cavendish, written to his executor a few days before his death, accuses John Davis of being a "villain" who caused the "decay of the whole action". John Davis continued on with Cavendish's crew and ships and discovered the Falkland Islands before returning to England with most of his crew lost to starvation and illness.

== In popular culture ==
- Cavendish is the central figure in the 1948 historical novel Captain for Elizabeth by Jan Westcott, which follows the events of his first circumnavigation.
- Cavendish tobacco, a popular pipe tobacco, is named after Thomas Cavendish.
- In the anime and manga series One Piece, a pirate named Cavendish refers to Thomas Cavendish.

== See also ==
- Pedro de Unamuno
- Christian Doctrine in the Brasílica Language
