= Doutrina christaã na linguoa brasilica =

16th-century manuscript in Old Tupi

Christian Doctrine in the Brasílica Language
- Bodleian Library
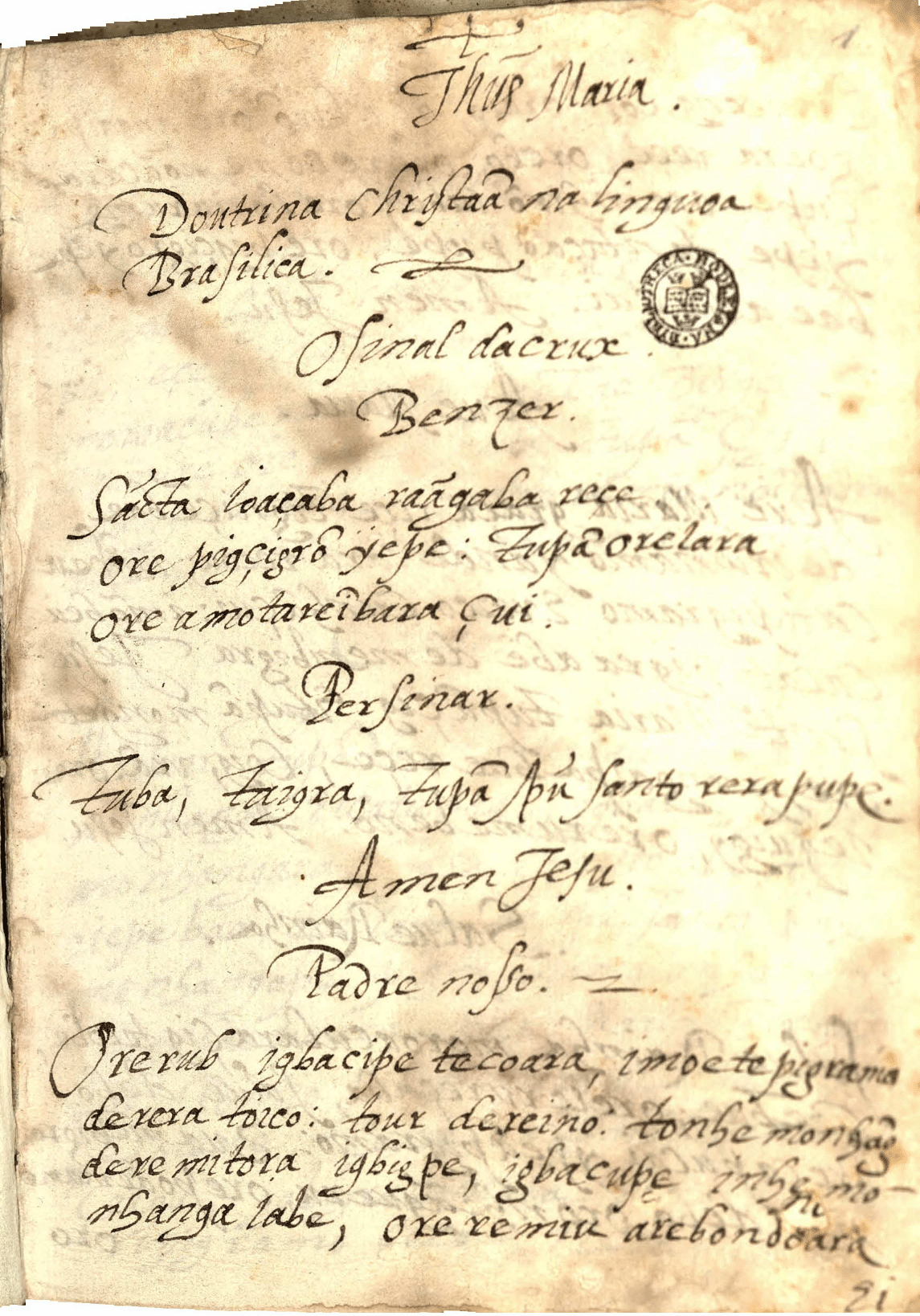
- First page, with the beginning of the Lord's Prayer in Old Tupi
- Type: Religious text
- Date: Between 1549 and 1591
- Language: Old Tupi
- Script: Latin script
- Accession: MS. Bodl. 617

Christian Doctrine in the Brasílica Language (Portuguese: Doutrina cristã na língua brasílica) (Note: In the original spelling, Doutrina christaã na linguoa brasilica) is an undated, anonymous manuscript written almost entirely in Old Tupi. (Note: The terms "língua geral" and "nheengatu" are not pertinent to a 16th-century document.)

Stolen by Thomas Lodge from the library of the Jesuit college of Santos in 1591, it is currently housed in the Bodleian Library at the University of Oxford, cataloged as "MS. Bodl. 617". It was composed between 1549 and 1591, a period spanning from the arrival of the Jesuits in Brazil to the theft of the manuscript and its subsequent transportation to England.

== Composition ==
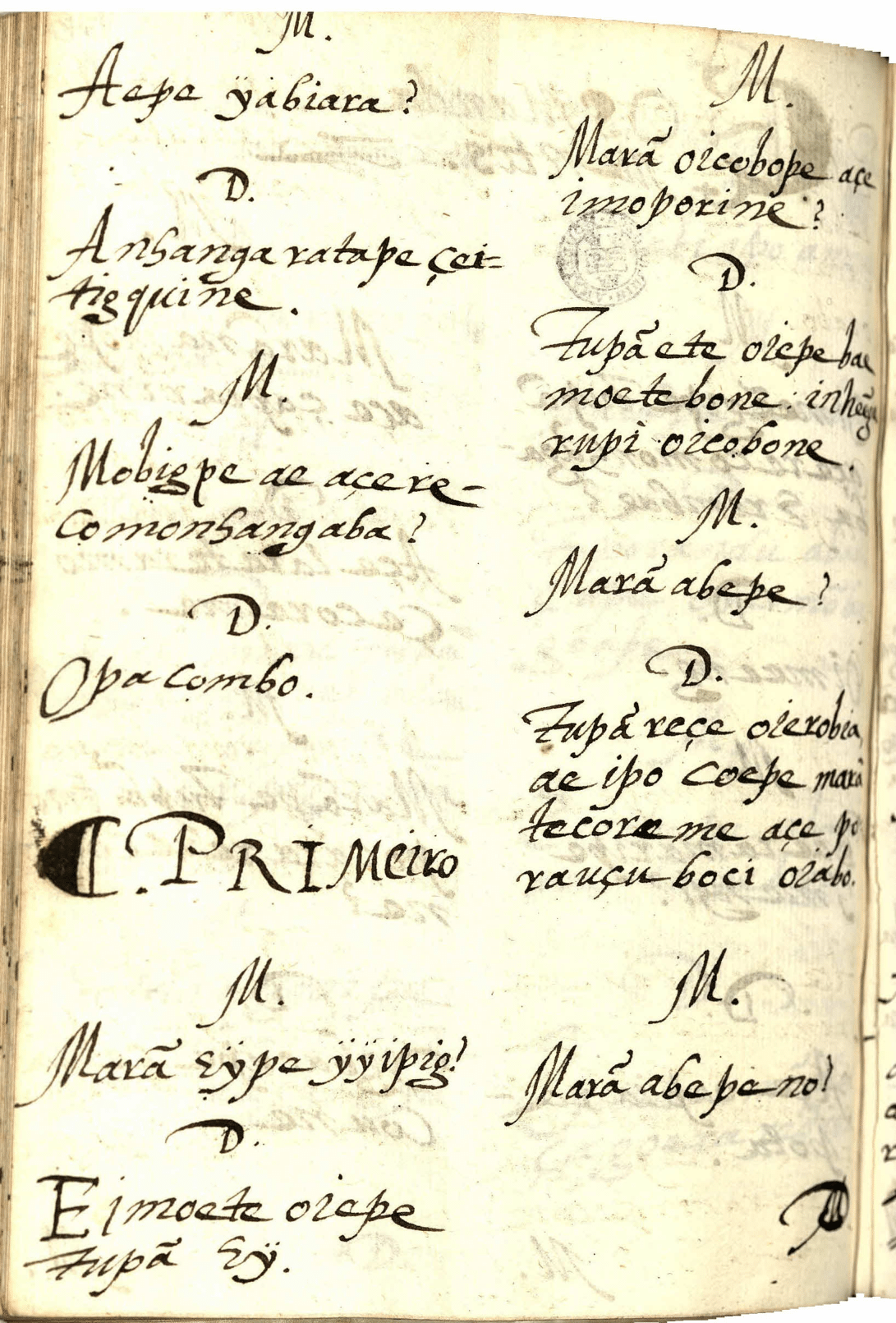
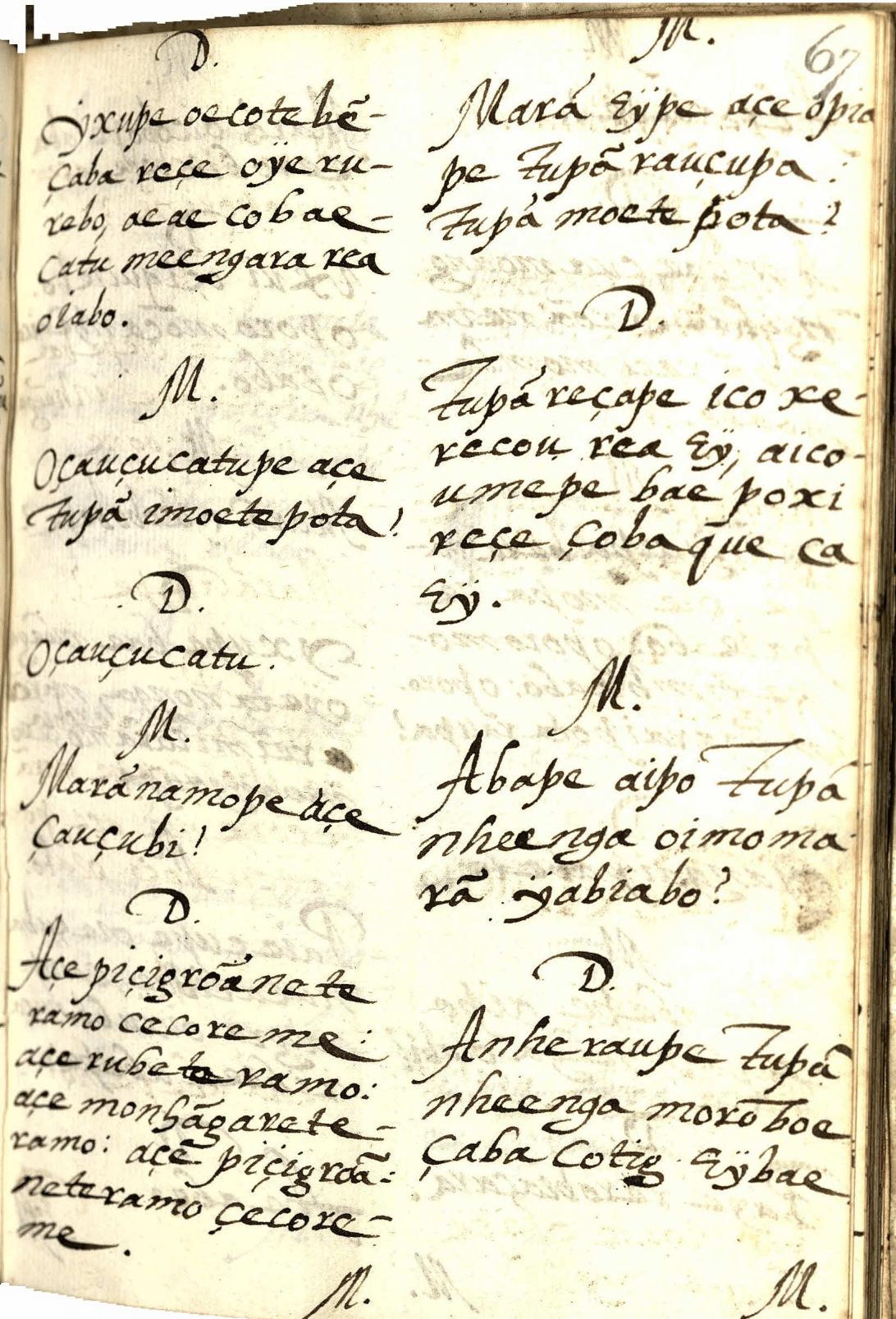
Manuscript pages

Composed between 1549 and 1591, a period spanning from the arrival of the Jesuits in Brazil to the theft of the manuscript and its subsequent transportation to England, Christian Doctrine in the Brasílica Language belongs to a tradition of translation, circulation, and use of religious texts in Brazil; therefore, its authorship is challenging to ascertain. For instance, João de Azpilcueta Navarro had already translated texts related to creation and incarnation in 1550. In 1553, Pero Correia emphasized the importance of preparing materials in the indigenous language. In 1566, Marcos Jorge's doctrine reached Brazil and was translated into Old Tupi by Leonardo do Vale. Although catechetical texts in such language flourished, they were not printed in the 16th century. In 1592, Jesuits sought permission to print a Christian doctrine and the grammar of Joseph of Anchieta, but only the latter was printed, likely due to financial limitations. The Bodleian Library manuscript recalls some passages from the Catechism in the Brasílica Language by Antônio de Araújo, indicating both texts stem from a common process of use, revision, and emendation.

== Theft and transportation ==
The manuscript was stolen by Thomas Lodge from the library of the Jesuit college of Santos in 1591. (Note: According to the bookplate, "Ex-dono Thomas Lodge D. M. Oxoniensis. qui sua manu a Brasilia deduxit" (lit. 'Previously owned by Thomas Lodge, M.D., from Oxford University, who with his own hand removed it from Brazil').) Lodge was on a journey to the South Seas, perhaps in order to escape creditors. The captain of the expedition was Thomas Cavendish, the second Englishman to complete a circumnavigation around the Earth. Despite Cavendish's journey ending in disaster, Lodge was able to return to England with the manuscript. He kept it until the 1610s when he decided to donate it to a collection being assembled by Thomas Bodley. This donation is included by R. W. Hunt in A Summary Catalogue of Western Manuscripts in the Bodleian Library at Oxford, giving the work the title "Tupi" and dating its acquisition between 1613 and 1620. MS. Bodl. 617 was rediscovered by researcher Vivien Kogut Lessa de Sá while she was searching for information about Lodge. As of 2013, she was preparing the manuscript for its first edition.

== See also ==
- Le langaige du Bresil

== Bibliography ==
- Barros, Cândida; Monserrat, Ruth (2019). "Algumas divergências na tradução do cristianismo para o tupi em catecismos jesuíticos (séculos XVI-XVII)" [Some divergences in the translation of Christianity into Tupi in Jesuit catechisms (16th–17th centuries)]. Habitus (in Portuguese). 17 (2). Goiânia. doi:10.18224/hab.v17i2.7604. Archived from the original on 15 June 2022.
- Egan, Caroline; Lessa de Sá, Vivien Kogut (2020). "Translation and prolepsis: the Jesuit origins of a Tupi Christian doctrine". In Newson, Linda A. (ed.). Cultural Worlds of the Jesuits in Colonial Latin America. London: University of London Press. ISBN 978-1-908857-75-0. JSTOR j.ctvwrm4h1.
