= Paulista General Language =

Extinct Tupi-based language of southern Brazil

- Austral Tupi
- Native to: Brazil
- Region: Paulistania
- Ethnicity: Caipira, Paulistas
- Era: 16th–20th centuries
- Language family: Tupian: Tupi–Guarani; Group III; Tupi; Paulista General Language
- Sources: Modern Paulista

Language codes
- ISO 639-3: –
- Glottolog: tupi1274

The Paulista General Language, also called Southern General Language and Austral Tupi, was a lingua franca and creole language formed in the 16th century, in the Captaincy of São Vicente. Today it is only of historical interest, as it has been a dead language since the beginning of the 20th century. It constituted the southern branch of the Língua Geral.

With influence on Brazilian toponymy, the Paulista General Language bequeathed many current Brazilian toponyms, such as Aricanduva, Baquirivu-Guaçu, Batovi, Batuquara, Bicuíba, Biriricas, and others.

In 2014, during research at the University of Campinas, a new source of studies for the language was identified. The document, entitled Vocabulário Elementar da Língua Geral Brasílica (Elementary Vocabulary of the General Brasílica Language), was published in 1936 in the Journal of the Municipal Archive of São Paulo. Although the title mentions the Brasílica language (ancient Tupi), the vocabulary written by José Joaquim Machado de Oliveira is effectively one of the sources for the Paulista General Language.

== History ==
In the history of Brazil, the Portuguese colonization officially began with the foundation of the Captaincy of São Vicente by the Portuguese nobleman Martim Afonso de Sousa, on January 22, 1532. When Martim Afonso arrived in São Vicente, he met a group of Portuguese, Spanish and Indigenous convicts, led by the Portuguese João Ramalho. Ramalho acted as an intermediary in the negotiations between the Tupi Indians and the Portuguese colonizers. He had a close relationship with the natives of the region, was married to Bartira, daughter of the chief Tibiriçá, and was already established among the Tupi since 1508.

With the officialisation of Portuguese colonisation in 1532, the union between white men and indigenous women became frequent, as the scarcity of white women on the Piratininga Plateau meant that, from the early days, the white inhabitant sought out the Indian in legitimate or temporary and multiple unions. The Indian leaders, with the intention of establishing stable alliances with foreigners who had many new and desirable material goods, initially supported this type of interethnic union. The population of the coastal regions of São Vicente, Piratininga and Alto Tietê, at the time of colonization, was made up almost entirely of Guayanás, Tupis and Carijós, speakers of the Tupi language.

The scarcity or total absence of white women in the region can be explained by the fact that the first groups of settlers who disembarked in the Capitania of São Vicente were exclusively composed of men, many of them convicts or castaways. Only five years after the foundation of the captaincy, the first Portuguese couple disembarked in São Vicente.

The interethnic unions, however, were not interrupted with the arrival of this and other couples and the coming of Portuguese wives. What predominated in the region in the first decades of colonisation was the union between white men and Tupi women. In this context, the caboclo emerged in the region, whose mother tongue was the Tupi of the mothers and also of all the relatives, since on the father's side there were no consanguineous relatives. This situation lasted for a long time and the Tupi language prevailed among the Paulista population in the first centuries of Portuguese colonisation.

Gradually, the Tupi of São Paulo ceased to constitute an independent and culturally diverse people and their language began to reproduce itself essentially as the language of the caboclos. The language spoken by this caboclo population gradually became different from the genuine Tupi. In the 17th and 18th centuries, this language, already widespread among the Paulista population, became known as the "Paulista general language".

=== Bandeiras ===
The beginning of the bandeiras era, of mining and Indian preaching, in the 17th century, contributed to the maternal influence in the culture and language of the paulista population. Men and their children would go out on long expeditions for gold prospecting and mining, leaving their young children in the care of their mothers, who were mostly Tupi speakers. In this context, the paulista children, in their first years of life, were exposed exclusively to the Tupi language, having contact with the Paulista General Language only at the beginning of their adult life. The predominance of the Paulista General Language in the Bandeiras was almost total, thus, the range of the Paulista General Language was largely extended by the actions of the Bandeirantes in the 17th and 18th centuries. The Paulista General Language was spoken and taken by the bandeirantes from São Paulo to places corresponding to the present states of Minas Gerais, Goiás, Mato Grosso, Mato Grosso do Sul and Paraná.

=== 19th and 20th century ===
In the 19th century, even with the intense dissemination of the Portuguese language among the Paulista population, it was still possible to hear, albeit sporadically and only in the older generation, the Paulista General Language. In 1853, the politician and historian José Inocêncio Alves Alvim, says, having consulted some old men who still remember indigenous words of the Paulista General Language. We can infer from Alves Alvim's statement that in 1853, in the surroundings of the city of Iguape, the Paulista General Language, although it was no longer common among the population of the region, was still present in the memory of the older generation. In Curitiba, words from the Paulista General Language were also used, sometimes accompanied by the Portuguese language, as António de Alcântara Machado describes, referring to the paulista term "Ahiva" (English: bad):

In Curitiba, when I asked a poor man how his health was, he answered: sometimes well, sometimes ahiva.

Travelling to the sources of the São Francisco River and the Goiás Province, Augustin Saint-Hilaire presents 48 paulista words, collected by him at the beginning of the 19th century in zambo communities in the Minas Gerais Province.

=== Current history ===
==== Disappearance ====
At the end of the 18th century, the Portuguese crown, under the management of Sebastião José de Carvalho e Melo, Marquis of Pombal, banned the use of the Paulista General Language, severely punishing those who used it, imposing, from then on, the Portuguese language in Brazil, to ensure Portugal's unity and identity as a nation, bringing the idea of a homogeneous and stable language. However, few people from the colony could attend schools, which leads to the reasoning that, in homes, informal meetings, and in everyday life, the Paulista General Language continued to be spoken normally and the reforms were largely unsuccessful. Nation building over the newly independent Brazil was far more successful in reducing the language use but it only disappeared completely at the beginning of the 20th century, with the great wave of European migration. While in the capitals this language had fallen into disuse, in the interior it was still alive, and there are hypotheses that the Paulista General Language gave origin to the Caipira dialect, spoken in the Caipira cultural belt, known as Paulistania.

==== Records ====
The main known document of the Paulista General Language is the Dicionário de Verbos, undated and of unknown author, compiled and published by Carl Friedrich Philipp von Martius in his Glossaria linguarum brasiliensium, under the name of "Austral Tupi". This document was given to Martius by Ferdinand Denis, an important French historian and bibliographer who lived in the Kingdom of Brazil from 1816 to 1821. Besides the documents mentioned above, there is also a statement by Couto de Magalhães, in the introduction to the Avá-Canoeiro vocabulary, in which the author states that many of the names contained in the vocabulary are currently current among the paulistas of the people, called caipira. There were still, in the mid-nineteenth century, several expressions of the Paulista General Language in the discourse of the caipira people of São Paulo Province.

== Spanish and Guarani influences ==
In the early 17th century, the Paulista Bandeirantes began a series of raids against the Spanish Jesuit missions in search of Guarani slaves to work in Paulista lands. The contact established during this period of wars between Paulistas and Spaniards brought elements of both the Spanish language and Guarani into the Paulista General Language. Besides the times of war, the slavery of Guarani people, brought from Guayrá (now Paraná) and Tapes (now Rio Grande do Sul) and Carijós from Santa Catarina brought influences to the Paulista General Language when they were taken to the region of São Vicente. However, it is believed that because it expanded through the bandeirantes, the Paulista General Language probably presents a greater influence of the Portuguese language.

=== Other general languages ===
Among the other general languages of Brazil, Paulista is closer to Guarani than to Nheengatu.

== See also ==
- Língua Geral
- Língua geral dos índios das Américas
