= Le langaige du Bresil =

1540s Old Tupi vocabulary

- Bibliothèque nationale de France
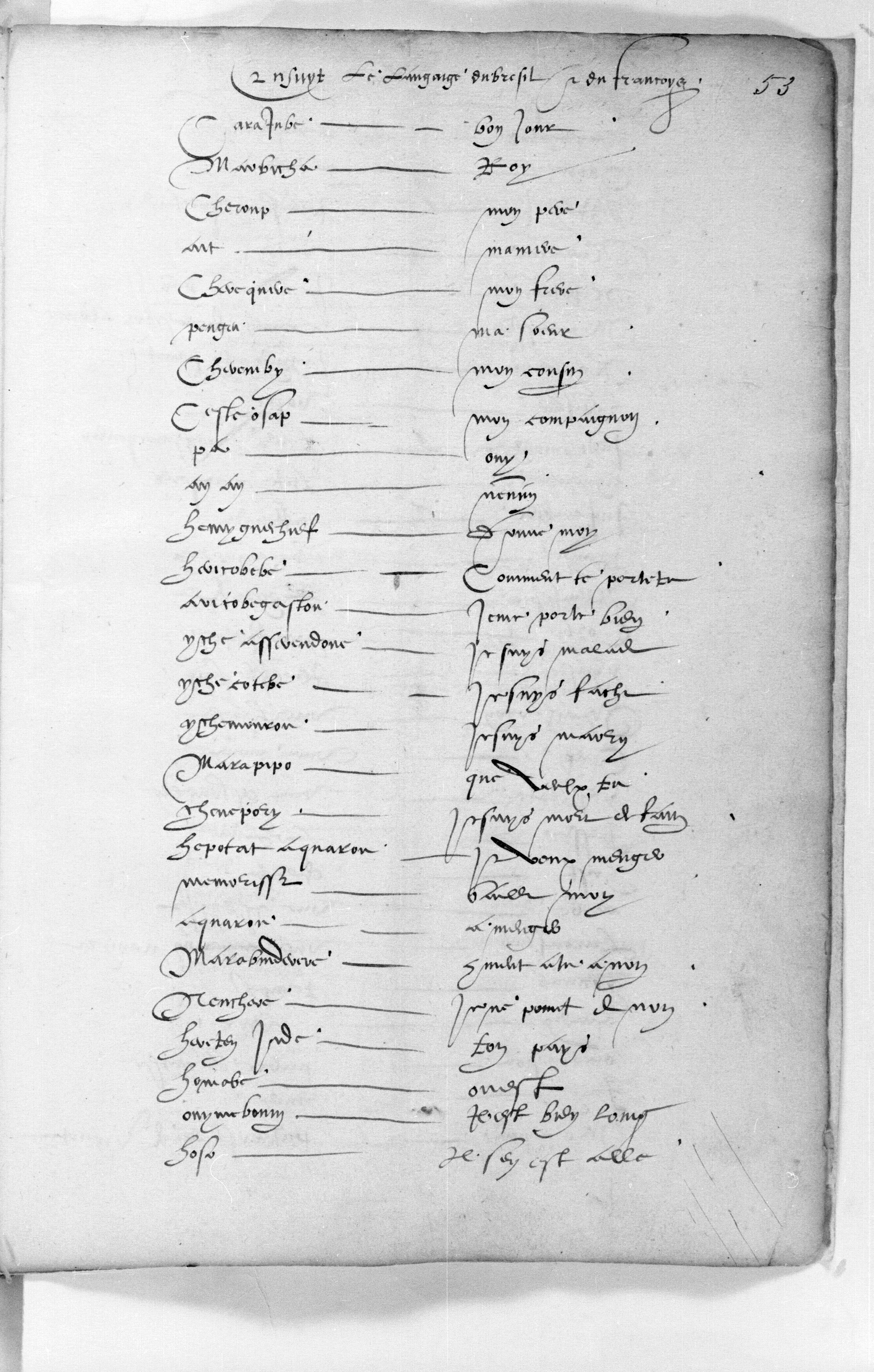
- First folio of the vocabulary
- Type: Vocabulary
- Date: 1540s
- Language(s): Middle French and Old Tupi
- Compiled by: Jehan Lamy
- Size: 53r–54r
- Script: Latin script
- Contents: 88 entries
- Accession: Ms. Fr. 24269
- The full text of Le langaige du Bresil at Wikisource

Le langaige du Bresil (lit. 'the language of Brazil') is a vocabulary produced in the 1540s, considered the oldest substantial record of a Brazilian language, specifically of Old Tupi. It is contained in a manuscript in the Bibliothèque nationale de France, cataloged as "Ms. Fr. 24269", from folio 53r to 54r, and presents 88 entries. Little is known about its compiler, a sea captain or voyage organizer, probably from Bordeaux or Rouen, named Jehan Lamy.

Le langaige du Bresil is important as it demonstrates social relations between the French and Brazilian Indigenous people were not merely limited to commercial interactions, but, on the contrary, both peoples maintained intimate social contacts with each other.

== Context ==
The tribes that spoke Old Tupi were first mentioned during the discovery of Brazil in 1500, on the occasion of the voyage of Pedro Álvares Cabral, but such accounts—like Pero Vaz de Caminha's letter of 1 May 1500—did not include records of this language. Although the word tubaram (lit. 'shark') appears in Caminha's letter, it is considered "with high probability" a Carib loan. Documents written after Caminha regarding the discovery and nature of Brazil likewise do not reflect linguistic contact with the Tupis. Toponyms, anthroponyms, as well as Tupi terms, can be found in early Portuguese nautical documents, such as those from the 1511 voyage of the ship Bretoa, the first to contain words of such origin. The ship's logbook lists—alongside parrots, monkeys, and cats—the specific designations of two species, namely tuim (in the original spelling toy ; a small, predominantly green bird of the order Psittaciformes) and sagui (in the original spelling çagoym ; a primate of the family Callitrichidae), (Note: "It. ho capytam trespapagayos e dous toys e hu gato e sam p. todos bj peças [...] It. ho mestre dous gatos e hu çagoym e sam p. todos iij peças".) which became the earliest Brazilian words of Tupi origin documented in Portuguese. (Note: Teodoro Sampaio suggests the placename Cananéia is of Tupi origin, deriving from kanindé, a type of macaw; Cananéia is attested as early as 1508 in Ruysch's map, in the form Cananor.)

However, the first known attempt to prepare a list of Tupi terms occurred during the circumnavigation voyage of Ferdinand Magellan in 1519. Collected in Guanabara Bay by Italian chronicler Antonio Pigafetta in the appendix to his travel report Primo viaggio intorno al globo terracqueo, the five or six recorded words, out of a total of 12 designated as "vocaboli del Brasile", refer to the names given by the Tupinambás to the trade items brought by the Europeans, as well as the name of the food these travelers obtained through barter, that is, cassava flour. (Note: The documented words are "knife" (in the original spelling tacse, actually itakysé ), "scissors" (in the original spelling pirame, actually pirãîa ), "fishhook" (in the original spelling pinda, actually pindá ), "flour" (in the original spelling hui, actually u'i ), and perhaps "comb" (in the original spelling chigap, actually kygûap ). A sixth word that could raise doubts is "jingle bells" (in the original spelling hanmaraca, actually itamaraká ). However, there are versions of the writing of Pigafetta where the variants itemnaraca, itenmaraca, and itanmaraca appear, confirming that it is indeed a Tupi word.) According to Brazilian linguist Aryon Dall'Igna Rodrigues, some words have been mistakenly attributed to Brazil and are actually from a language of the Arawakan family in the Greater Antilles, such as cacich (lit. 'king'), canoe (lit. 'boat'), and maiz (lit. 'millet' or 'corn'); Volker Noll specifies canoe as being from "Caribbean Taíno".

== Manuscript ==
The manuscript is located in the Bibliothèque nationale de France, cataloged as "Ms. Fr. 24269". Very little is known about its author, except he was a sea captain or voyage organizer, probably from Bordeaux or Rouen, named Jehan Lamy. (Note: Sometimes identified as Jean Cordier; in this case, he is said to be a Rouennais.) The document, originating from the 1540s and dated 1547, contains a nautical compendium, a vocabulary of an African language spoken on the Pepper Coast (Liberia) identified as the "Kra language" (from folio 51r to 52r), (Note: Le langaige de Guynee is the title of this vocabulary. Hair describes it as "Krao, or at least of one of the Kra languages".) and a vocabulary of Old Tupi (from folio 53r to 54r).

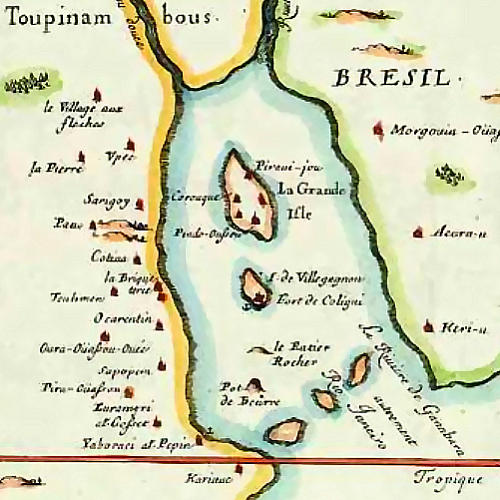
16th-century French accounts–based map of Guanabara Bay (colored)

Le langaige du Bresil 's entries were probably collected in Guanabara Bay, similar to the few words recorded by Antonio Pigafetta. It presents 88 items, although some words are repeated. The Indigenous expressions and words were placed on the left, and their French equivalents on the right. There are no differences between medial "u" and "n" in the manuscript, and this absence makes it difficult to precisely understand what is written, at least in the entries in Old Tupi. There is also the possibility of errors in reading sequences involving the letters "i", "u" (or "n"), and "m". Among the words recorded by Pigafetta, the vocabulary of Jehan Lamy includes "knife" and "scissors" (respectively spelled as taxe and pyrain by him, differently from the tacse and pirame by Pigafetta).

Le langaige du Bresil is roughly contemporaneous with the earliest Spanish records of Quechua, thus being one of the oldest documentary sources of any South American language. Its existence has been known since at least 1916, when the work was cited by French historian Albert Anthiaume.

=== Vocabulary contents ===
The Old Tupi vocabulary compiled by Jehan Lamy holds historical importance in illustrating the social relations between French sailors and Brazilian Indigenous people. When compared with the other vocabulary in the same manuscript, that is, of Kra, some relevant differences can be noted.

Firstly, the Tupi vocabulary, with 88 items, is more extensive than the Kra vocabulary, which has 64 entries. The terms convey, for example, individual contacts, friendly conversation, family and friendship ties, parts of the body, food, hunger and thirst, objects and clothing, as well as geographical and climatic notions. A single term designates a political institution, marbicha (roy ; lit. 'king'). (Note: Identified by Dalby & Hair as morubixaba, the word literally means "chief of people" and was used to refer to tribal leaders.) Unfriendly expressions are fewer in number, and there are only two terms related to war, orapat (ung arc ; lit. 'a bow') and ououb (des flesches ; lit. 'arrows'). One of the Indigenous words, imbo, has no equivalent in French, and it probably refers to a type of tree frequently mentioned in early sources, the imbu or Brazil plum, Spondias tuberosa. There is a word, recorded twice in the slightly different forms macharron and marsarron, of presumed Portuguese origin, possibly borrowed from machado, lit. 'axe'; Lamy translates both as une hache, lit. 'an axe'.

Le langaige du Bresil appears to have been based mainly on non-commercial conversations; there are no references to brazilwood, which was the main product exported from the Brazilian coast at the time. Furthermore, the existence of terms related to body parts and relationships (Note: For example, cheroup (mon pere ; lit. 'my father'), ait (ma mere ; lit. 'my mother'), and chiapt (les cheveux ; lit. 'the head hair')) indicates a certain degree of intimate social contact (not necessarily always friendly). Some entries refer to the society and culture of the Tupis, as well as others dedicated to the fauna and flora of Brazil. (Note: For example, augerou coural (ung perrocquet ; lit. 'a parakeet'), tabity (ung lievre ; lit. 'a hare'), and tappire (ung chacal ; lit. 'a jackal')) On the other hand, the vocabulary of the Kra language primarily focuses on commercial interactions, emphasizing phrases related to negotiation and bargaining. There are no words related to African culture or society. Nor are there references to slaves or their trade.

The greater extent of the Tupi vocabulary can be attributed to better linguistic and climatic conditions in the region where it was collected compared to the Guinea region. Indeed, it was easier for Europeans to settle on the Brazilian coast and stay there for a longer time, and the existence of a main language spoken throughout the area made it worthwhile to master it. Variations in the spelling of Old Tupi found in documents from French travelers of the 16th century, such as André Thevet and Jean de Léry, seem to indicate these materials did not come from a common source but, on the contrary, from a historical context of social interactions with the Indigenous people of Brazil.

== Gallery ==
Le langaige du Bresil original manuscript
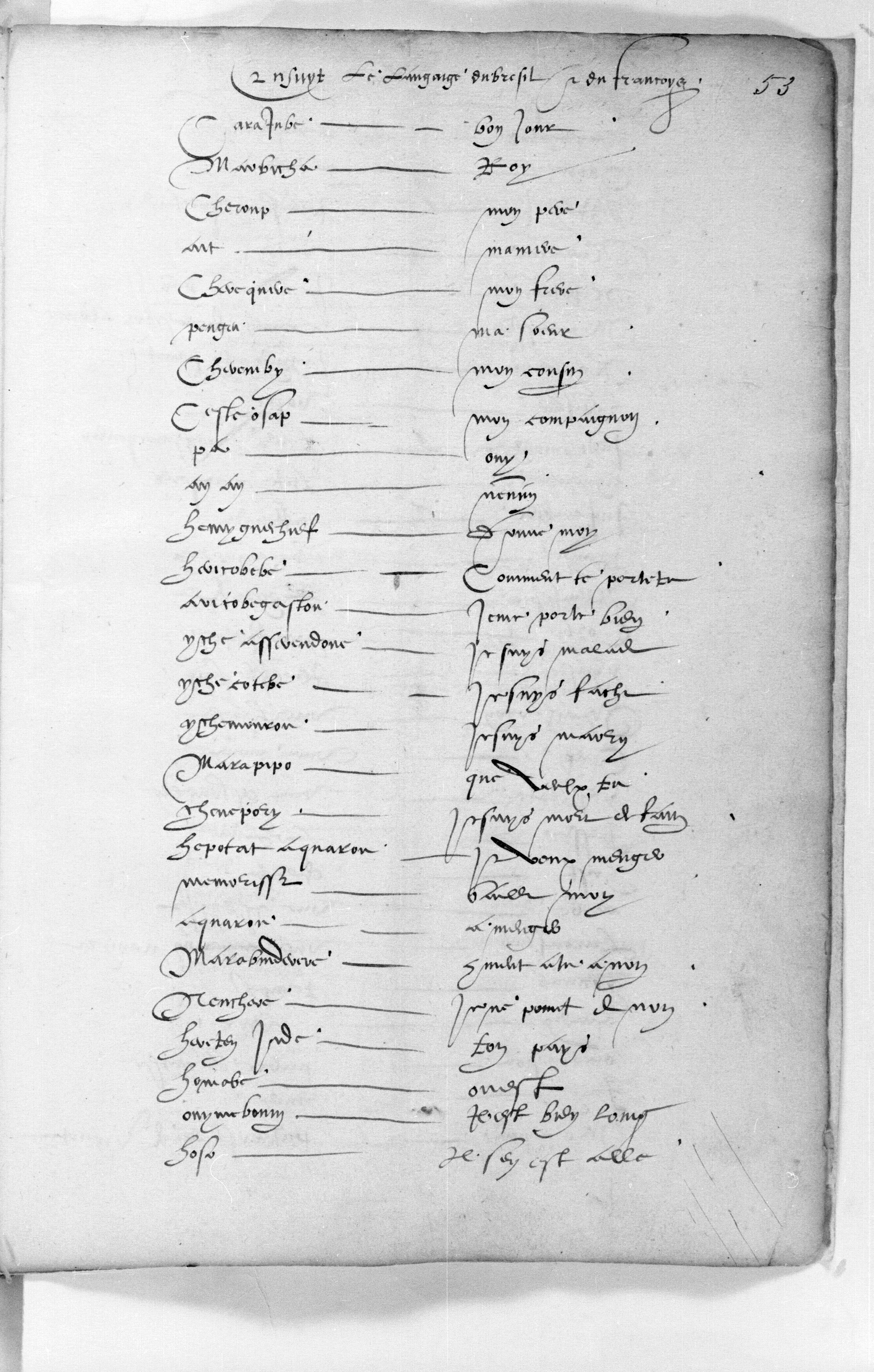
Folio 53r

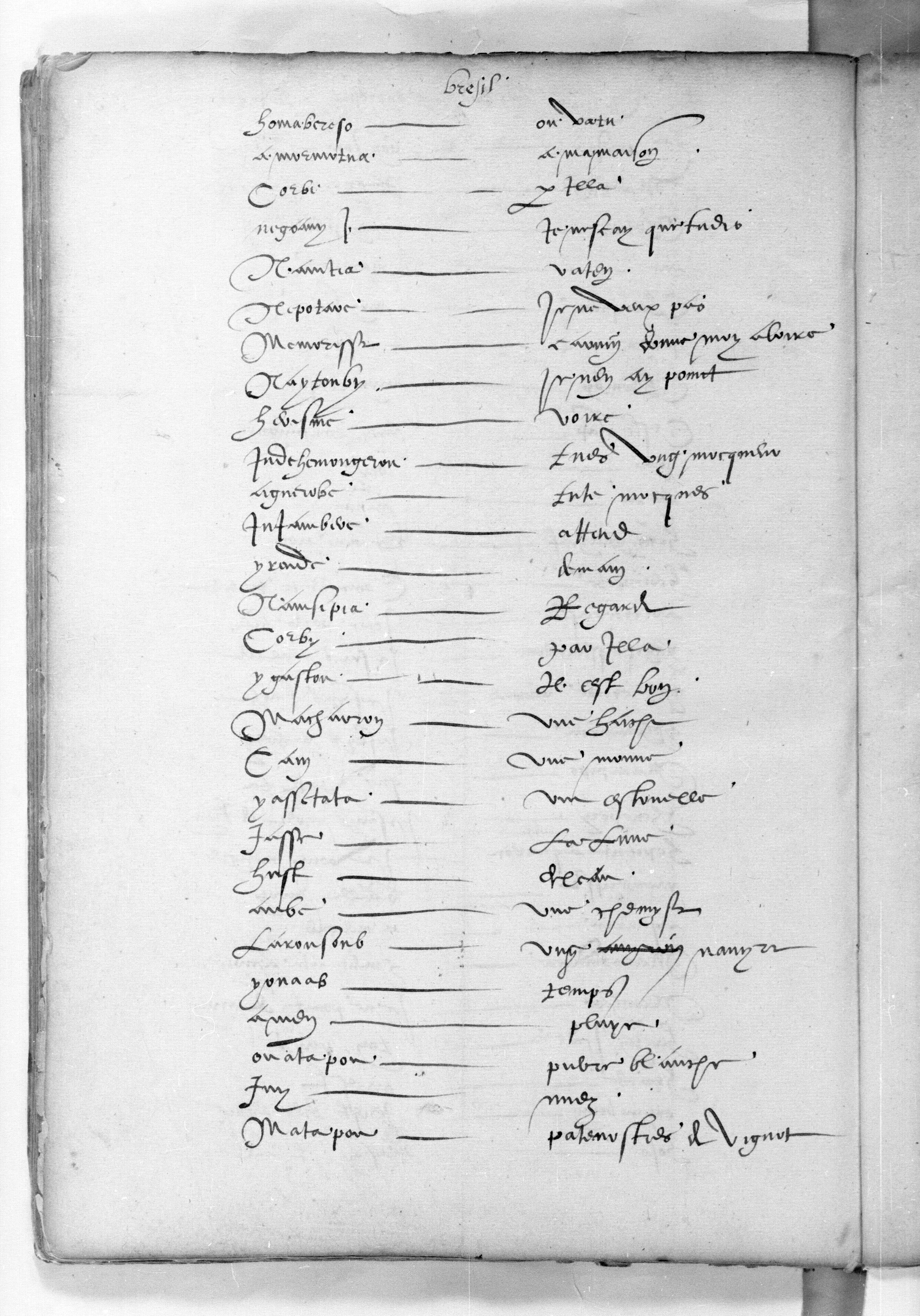
Folio 53v

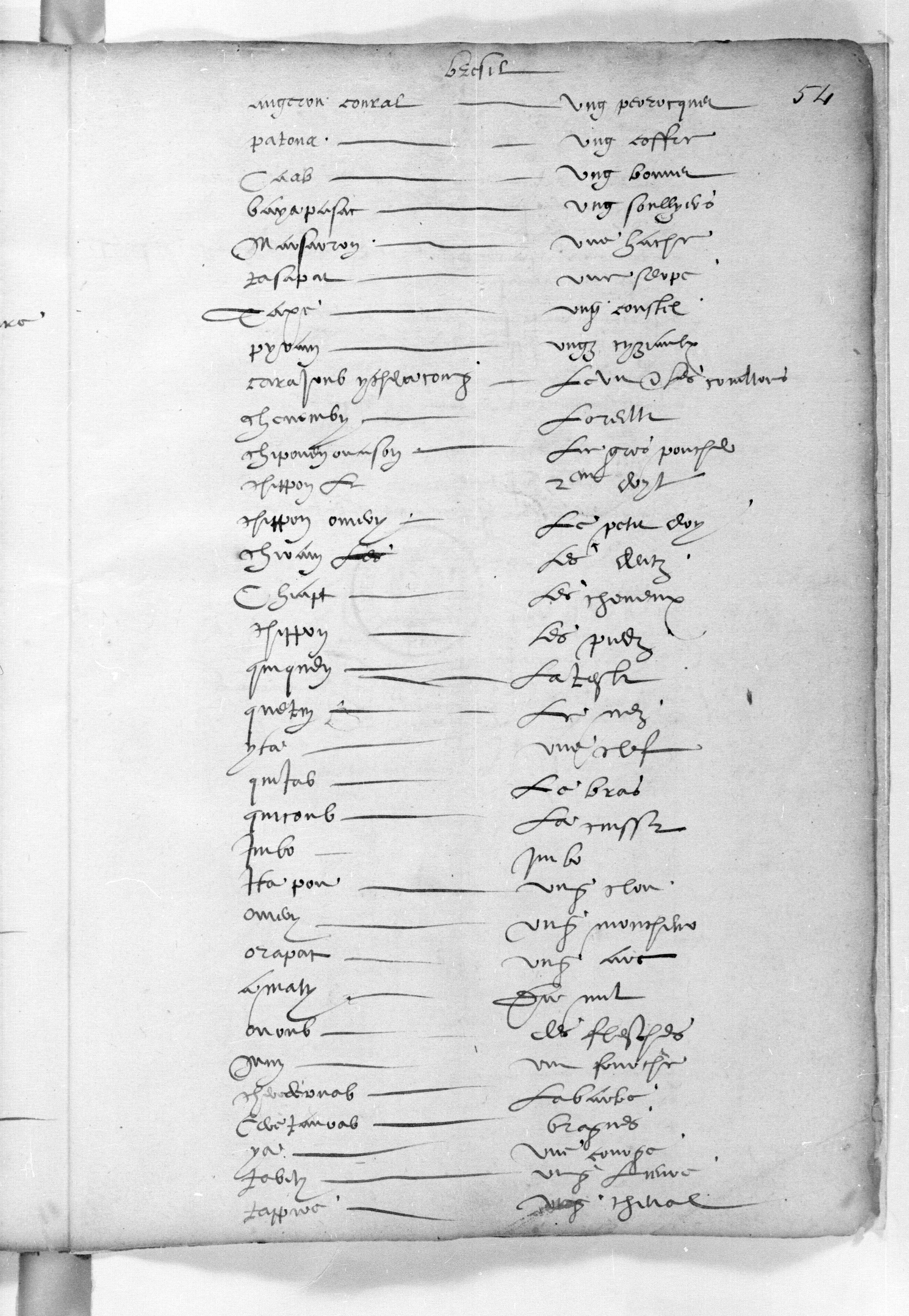
Folio 54r
Le langaige du Bresil transcription by Dalby & Hair 1966
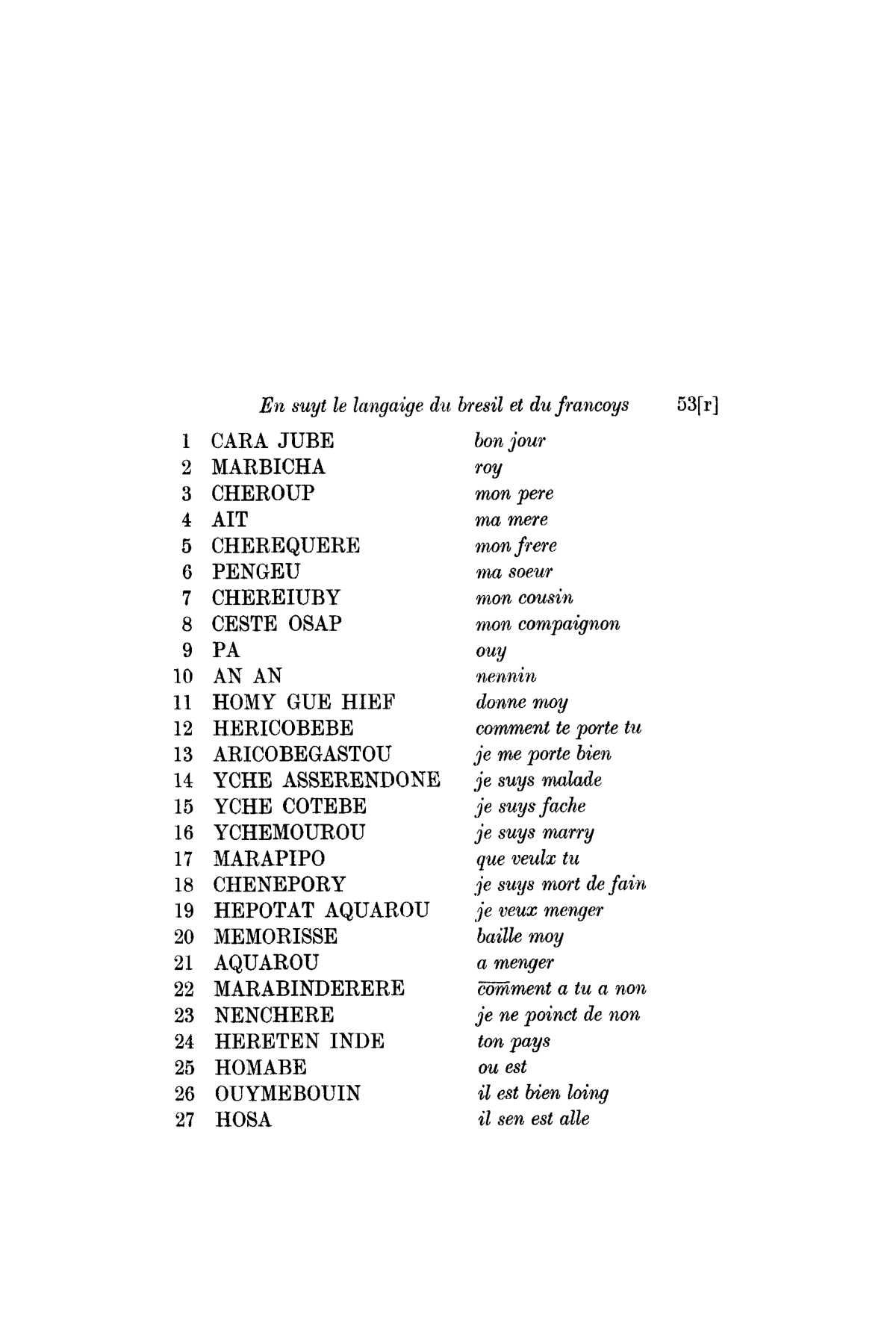
First part

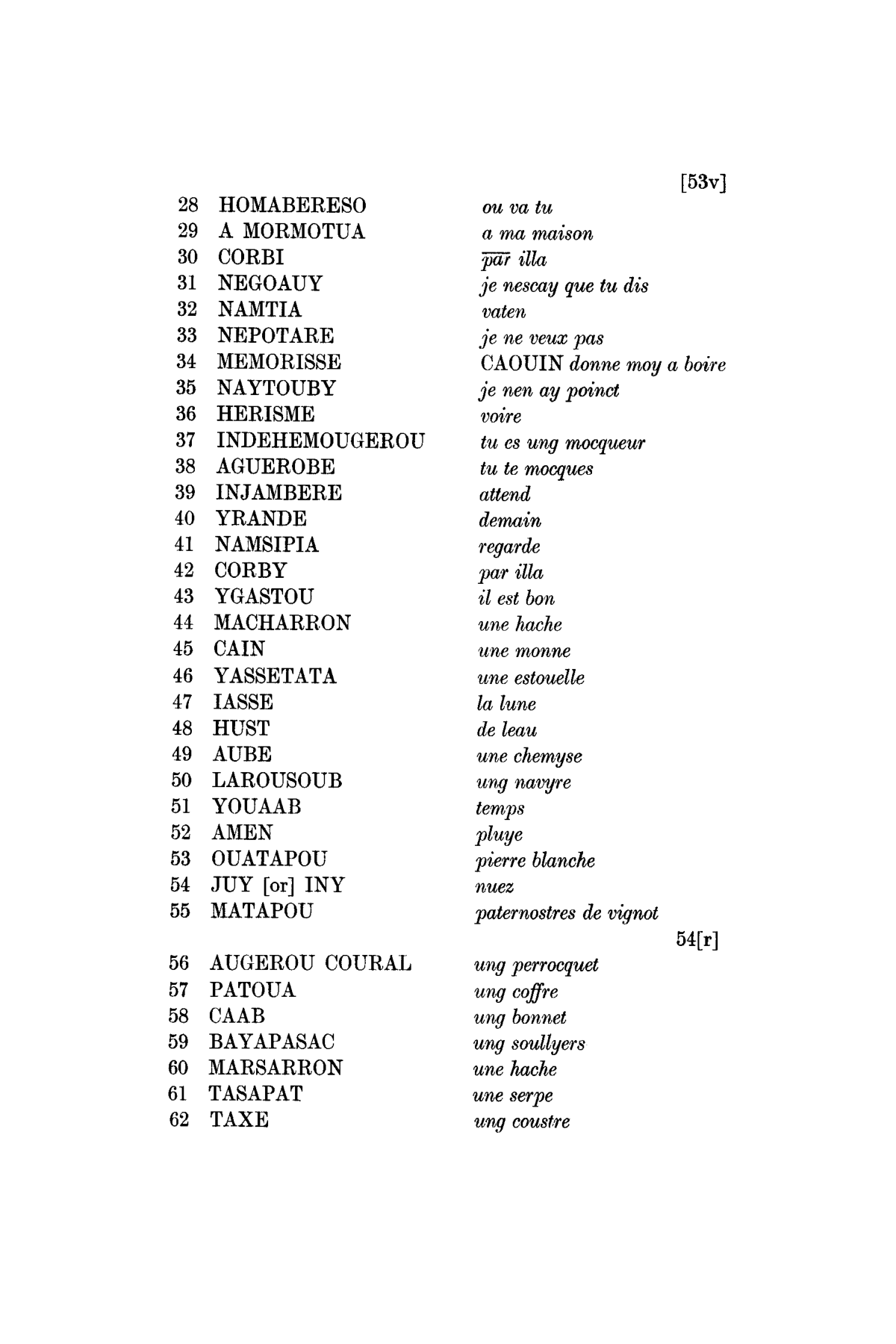
Second part

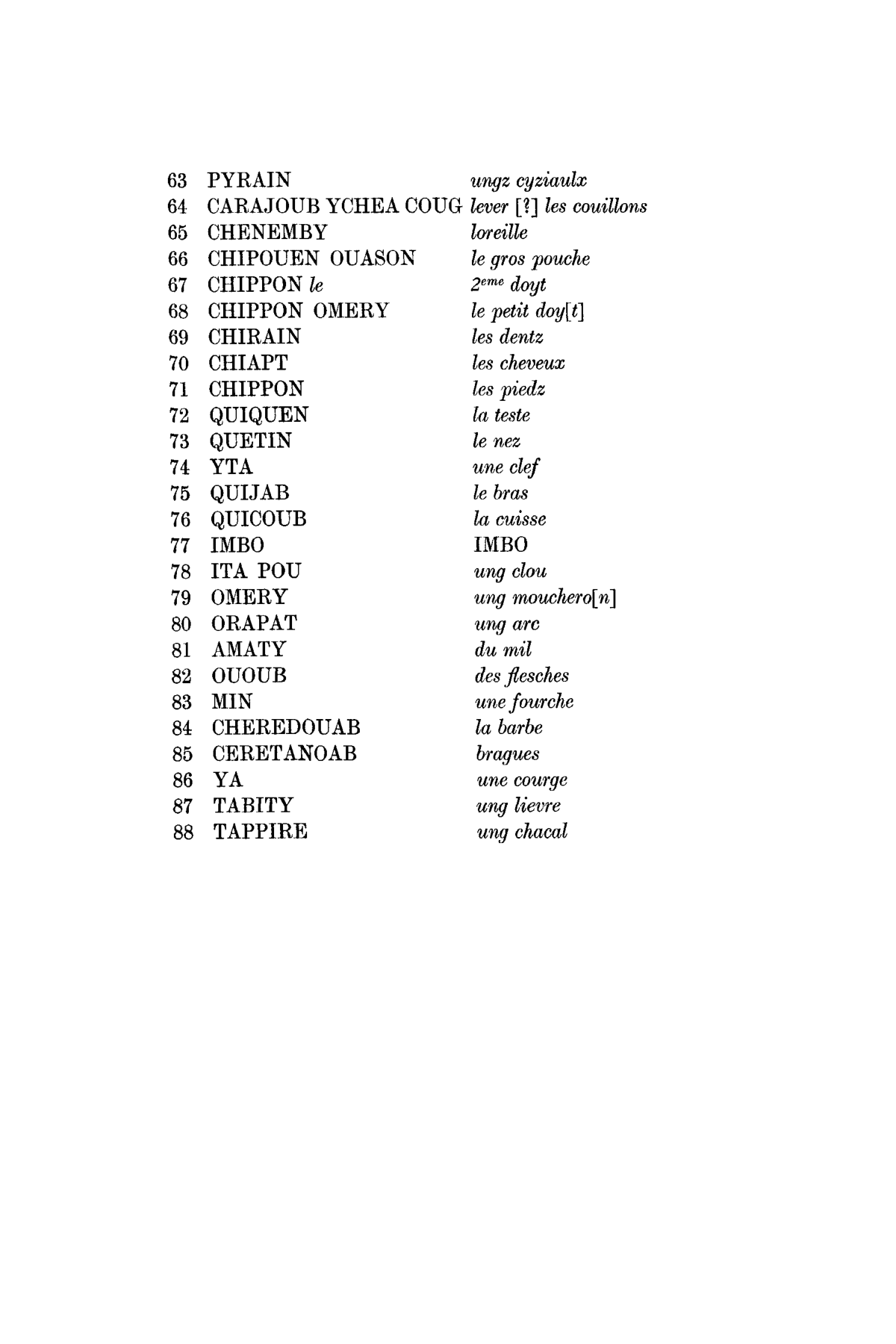
Third and last part

== See also ==
- Art of Grammar of the Most Used Language on the Coast of Brazil
- Christian Doctrine in the Brasílica Language
- History of Tupi
- Língua geral dos índios das Américas

== Bibliography ==
- Blair, Emma Helen; Robertson, James Alexander (1906). The Philippine Islands, 1493–1898. Vol. 33. Cleveland: The Arthur H. Clark Company. Archived from the original on 26 April 2024.
- Dalby, David; Hair, P. E. H. (November 1966). "'Le langaige du Bresil': a Tupi vocabulary of the 1540s". Transactions of the Philological Society. 65 (1): 42–66. doi:10.1111/j.1467-968X.1966.tb00329.x.
- Garcia, Rodolfo (1942). "Exotismos franceses originários da língua Tupi" [French exotisms originating from the Tupi language]. Anais da Biblioteca Nacional do Rio de Janeiro (in Portuguese). 64. Archived from the original on 13 June 2024.
- Hair, P. E. H. (1992). Barbot's West African vocabularies of c. 1680. Liverpool: Centre of African Studies. Archived from the original on 12 July 2024.
- Mollat, Michel (1967). "As primeiras relações entre a França e o Brasil: dos Verrazani a Villegainon" [The first relations between France and Brazil: from the Verrazani to Villegainon]. Revista de História (in Portuguese). 34 (70): 343. doi:10.11606/issn.2316-9141.rh.1967.126110. Archived from the original on 13 July 2024.
- Navarro, Eduardo de Almeida (2005). Método moderno de tupi antigo: a língua do Brasil dos primeiros séculos [Modern method of Old Tupi: the language of Brazil of the first centuries] (in Portuguese) (3rd ed.). São Paulo: Global. ISBN 978-85-260-1058-1.
- Navarro, Eduardo de Almeida (2013). Dicionário de tupi antigo: a língua indígena clássica do Brasil [Dictionary of Old Tupi: the classical Indigenous language of Brazil ] (in Portuguese) (1st ed.). São Paulo: Global. ISBN 978-85-260-1933-1.
- Noll, Volker (2024). "Os primeiros empréstimos tupis no português do Brasil" [The first Tupi borrowings in the Portuguese of Brazil]. In Dietrich, Wolf; Noll, Volker (eds.). O português e o tupi no Brasil [Portuguese and Tupi in Brazil ] (in Portuguese). São Paulo: Contexto. ISBN 978-85-7244-472-9.
- Papavero, Nelson; Teixeira, Dante Martins (2014). Zoonímia tupi nos escritos quinhentistas europeus [Tupi zoonymy in the 16th-century European writings] (in Portuguese). São Paulo: NEHiLP/FFLCH/USP. doi:10.11606/9788575062302. ISBN 978-85-7506-230-2. Archived from the original on 25 September 2024.
- Rodrigues, Aryon Dall'Igna (September 2000). "Breve história da língua dos índios vistos por Cabral" [Brief history of the language of the Indians seen by Cabral] (PDF). Universa (in Portuguese). 8 (3). Brasília. Archived (PDF) from the original on 3 January 2024.
- Sampaio, Theodoro (1914). O Tupi na Geographia Nacional [The Tupi in the National Geography] (in Portuguese) (2nd ed.). São Paulo: Empresa Typographica "O Pensamento".
- Viana, Diego (January 2022). "Estudos exploram os impactos culturais e sociais da experiência francesa na baía de Guanabara" [Studies explore the cultural and social impacts of the French experience in Guanabara Bay] (PDF). Pesquisa FAPESP (in Portuguese) (311). ISSN 1519-8774. Archived (PDF) from the original on 24 June 2024.
