= Colonial Brazil =

1500–1815 Portuguese possession in South America

Coordinates: 12°58′15″S 38°30′39″W

- 1500–1815
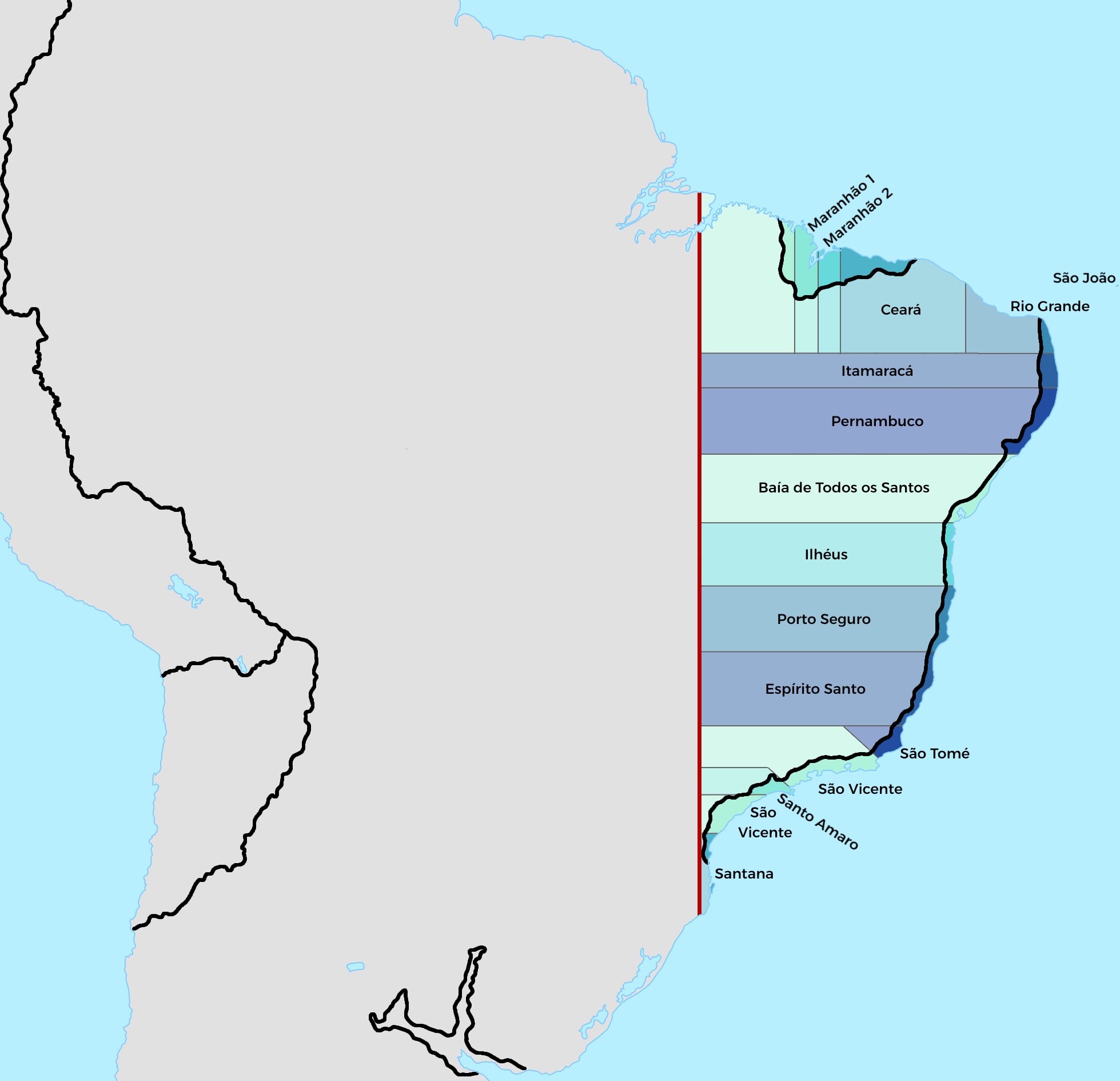
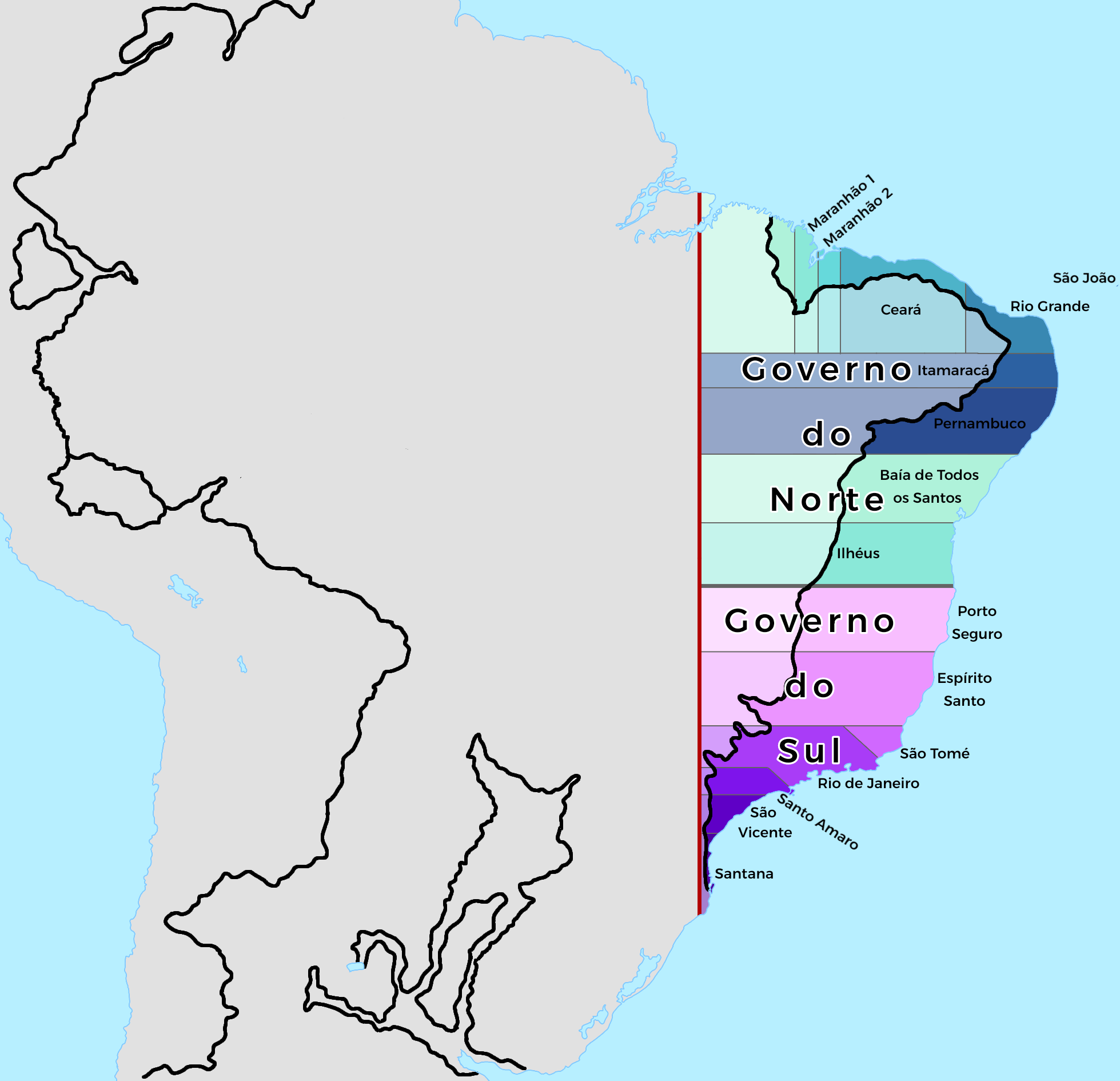
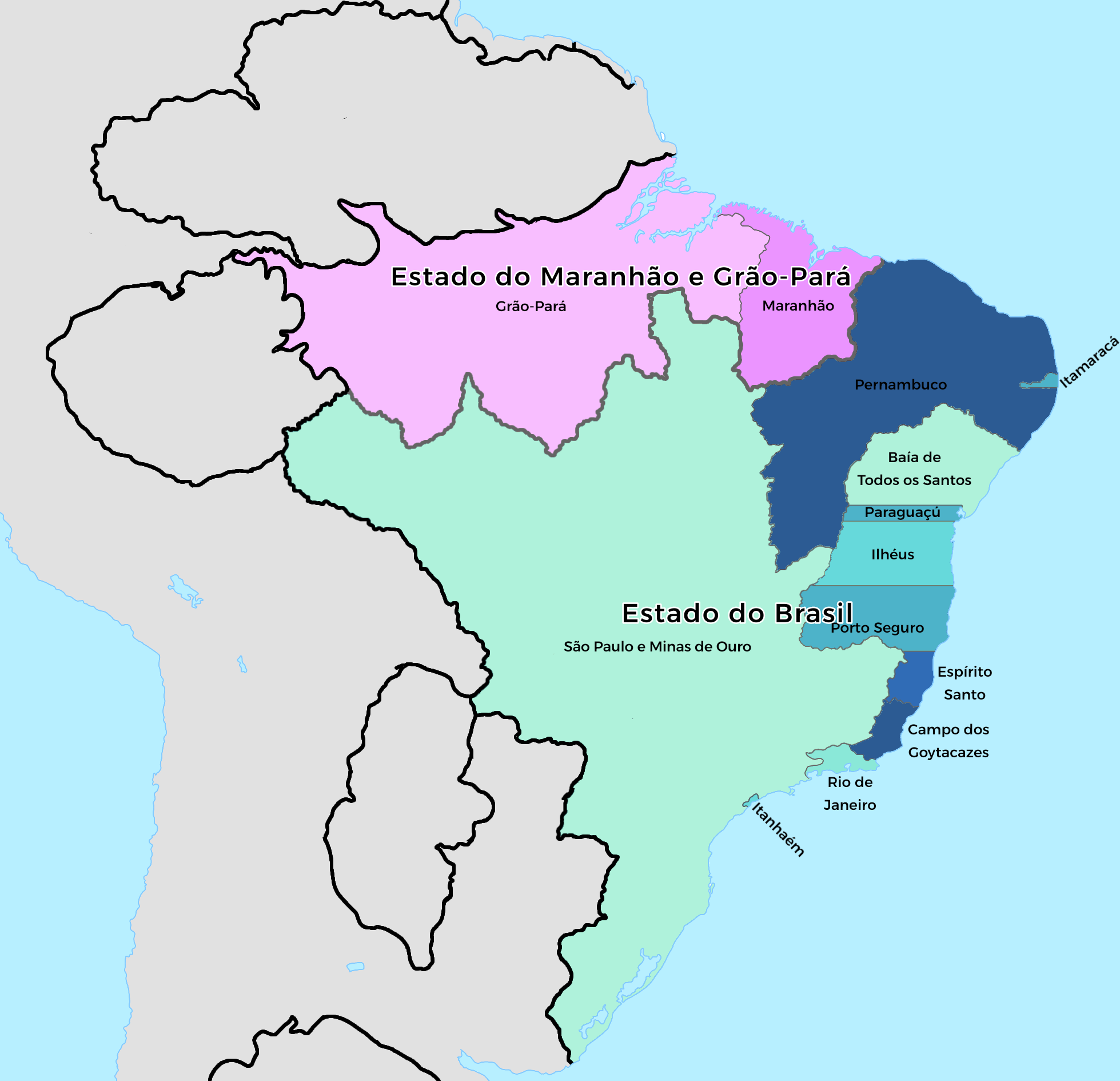
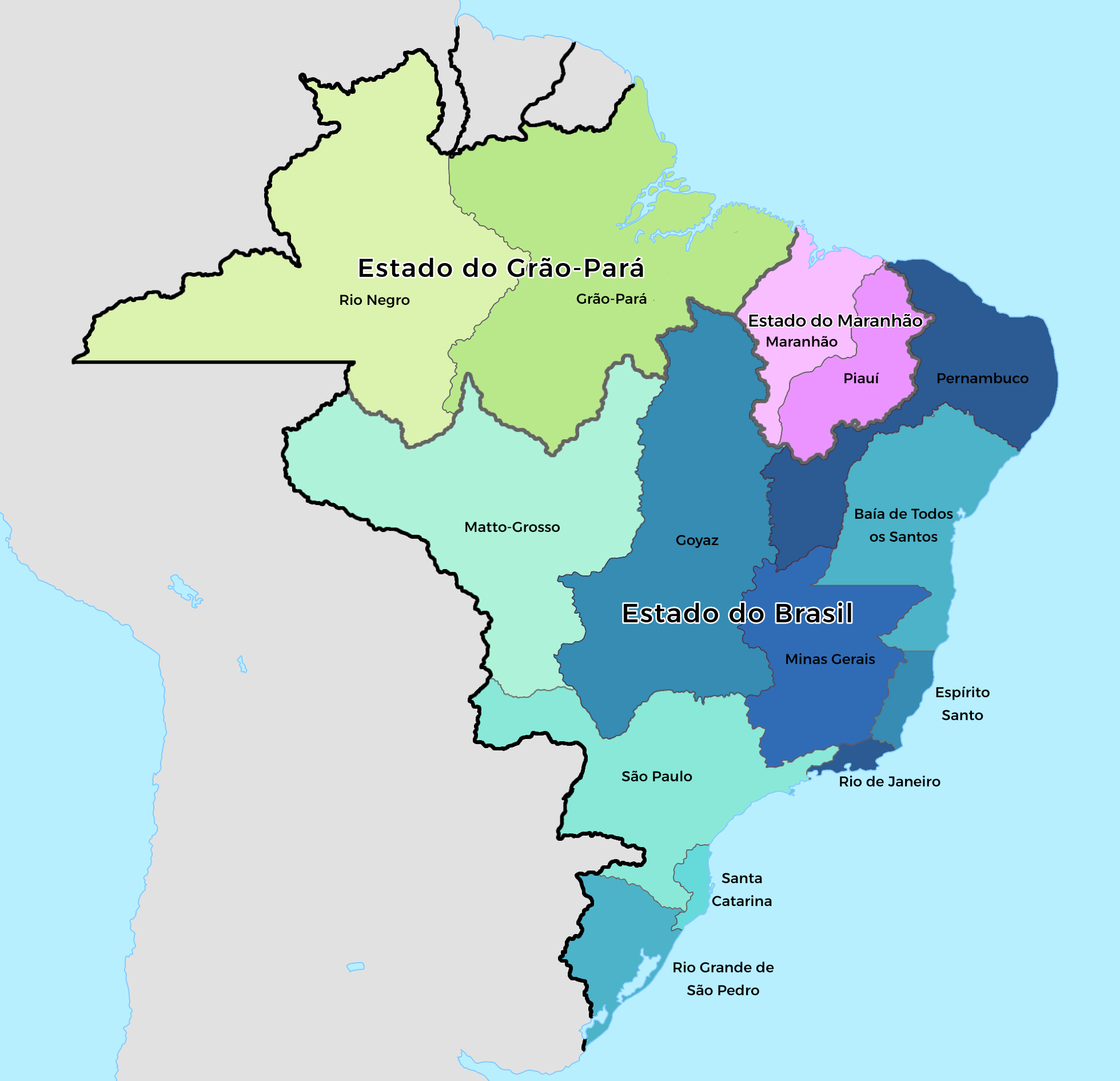
- Status: Colony of the Portuguese Empire
- Capital: Salvador (1549–1763); Rio de Janeiro (1763–1815)
- Common languages: Portuguese (official); Paulista General Language, Nheengatu, many indigenous languages
- Religion: Catholic (official); Afro-Brazilian religions, Judaism, indigenous practices
- Government: Absolute monarchy
- Monarch
  - 1500–1521: Manuel I (first)
  - 1777–1816: Maria I (last)
- Governor
  - 1549–1553: Tomé de Sousa (first, as governor-general)
  - 1806–1808: Marcos de Noronha (last, as viceroy)
- History
  - Portuguese arrival: 22 April 1500
  - Creation of United Kingdom of Portugal, Brazil and the Algarves: 16 December 1815

Area
  - Total: 8,100,200 km^{2} (3,127,500 sq mi)
- Currency: Portuguese real
Preceded by	Succeeded by
Pre-Cabraline history of Brazil; Indigenous peoples in Brazil	United Kingdom of Portugal, Brazil and the Algarves
- Today part of: Brazil; Uruguay

Colonial Brazil (Portuguese: Brasil Colonial), sometimes referred to as Portuguese America, comprises the period from 1500, with the arrival of the Portuguese, until 1815, when Brazil was elevated to a kingdom in union with Portugal. During the 300 years of Brazilian colonial history, the main economic activities of the territory were based first on they also made there own food

brazilwood extraction (brazilwood cycle), which gave the territory its name; sugar production (sugar cycle); and finally on gold and diamond mining (gold cycle). Slaves, especially those brought from Africa, provided most of the workforce of the Brazilian export economy after a brief initial period of Indigenous slavery to cut brazilwood.

In contrast to the neighboring Spanish possessions, which had several viceroyalties, the colony of Brazil was settled mainly in the coastal area by the Portuguese and a large black slave population working on sugar plantations and mines.

The boom and bust of the economic cycles were linked to export products. Brazil's sugar age, with the development of plantation slavery, merchants serving as middle men between production sites, Brazilian ports, and Europe was undermined by the growth of the sugar industry in the Caribbean on islands that European powers seized from Spain. Gold and diamonds were discovered and mined in southern Brazil through the end of the colonial era. Brazilian cities were largely port cities and the colonial administrative capital was moved from Salvador to Rio de Janeiro in response to the rise and fall of export products' importance.

Unlike Spanish America, which fragmented into many republics upon independence, Brazil remained a single administrative unit under a monarch as the Empire of Brazil, giving rise to the largest country in Latin America. Just as Spanish and Roman Catholicism were a core source of cohesion among Spain's vast and multi-ethnic territories, Brazilian society was united by the Portuguese language and Roman Catholicism. As the only Lusophone polity in the Americas, the Portuguese language was – and remains – particularly important to Brazilian identity.

== Initial European contact and early history (1494–1530) ==
Portugal pioneered the European charting of sea routes that were the first and only channels of interaction between all of the world's continents, thus beginning the process of globalization. In addition to the imperial and economic undertaking of discovery and colonization of lands distant from Europe, these years were filled with pronounced advancements in cartography, shipbuilding and navigational instruments, of which the Portuguese explorers took advantage.

In 1494, the two kingdoms of the Iberian Peninsula divided the New World between them in the Treaty of Tordesillas, and in 1500 navigator Pedro Álvares Cabral landed in what is now Brazil and laid claim to it in the name of king Manuel I of Portugal. The Portuguese identified in Portuguese brazilwood as a valuable red dye source and an exploitable product, and attempted to force indigenous groups in Brazil to cut the trees.

=== The Age of Exploration ===
Portuguese seafarers in the early fifteenth century, as an extension of the Portuguese Reconquista, began to expand from a small area of the Iberian Peninsula, to seizing the Muslim fortress of Ceuta in North Africa. Its maritime exploration then proceeded down the coast of West Africa and across the Indian Ocean to the south Asian subcontinent, as well as the Atlantic islands off the coast of Africa on the way. They sought sources of gold, ivory, and African slaves, high value goods in the African trade. The Portuguese set up fortified trading feitorias (factories), whereby permanent, fairly small commercial settlements anchored trade in a region.

The initial costs of setting up these commercial posts was borne by private investors, who in turn received hereditary titles and commercial advantages. From the Portuguese Crown's point of view, its realm was expanded with relatively little cost to itself. On the Atlantic islands of the Azores, Madeira, and São Tomé, the Portuguese began plantation production of sugarcane using forced labor, a precedent for Brazil's sugar production in the sixteenth and seventeenth centuries.

The Portuguese discovery of Brazil was preceded by a series of treaties between the kings of Portugal and Castile, following Portuguese sailings down the coast of Africa to India and the voyages to the Caribbean of the Genoese mariner sailing for Castile, Christopher Columbus. The most decisive of these treaties was the Treaty of Tordesillas, signed in 1494, which created the Tordesillas Meridian, dividing the world between the two kingdoms. All land discovered or to be discovered east of that meridian was to be the property of Portugal, and everything to the west of it went to Spain.

The Tordesillas Meridian divided South America into two parts, leaving a large chunk of land to be exploited by the Spaniards. The Treaty of Tordesillas has been called the earliest document in Brazilian history, since it determined that part of South America would be settled by Portugal instead of Spain. The Treaty of Tordesillas was an item of dispute for more than two and a half centuries but clearly established the Portuguese in America. It was replaced by the Treaty of Madrid in 1750, and both reflect the present extent of Brazil's coastline.

=== Arrival and early exploitation ===
Portuguese map by Lopo Homem (c. 1519), showing the coast of Brazil and natives extracting brazilwood, as well as Portuguese ships

On 22 April 1500, during the reign of king Manuel I, a fleet led by navigator Pedro Álvares Cabral landed in Brazil and took possession of the land in the name of the king. Although it is debated whether previous Portuguese explorers had already been in Brazil, this date is widely and politically accepted as the day of the discovery of Brazil by Europeans. The place where Álvares Cabral arrived is now known as Porto Seguro, in northeastern Brazil. Cabral was leading a large fleet of 13 ships and more than 1,000 men following Vasco da Gama's way to India, around Africa. Cabral was able to safely enter and leave Brazil in ten days, despite having no means of communication with the indigenous people there, due to the experience Portuguese explorers, such as Gama, had been amassing over the past few decades in interacting with foreign peoples.

The Portuguese colonization, around 80 years earlier, of islands off West Africa such as São Tomé and Príncipe, were the first examples of the Portuguese monarchy beginning to move from a crusading and looting-centric attitude, to a trade-centric attitude when approaching new lands. The latter attitude required communication and cooperation with indigenous people, thus, interpreters. This informed Cabral's actions in Brazil.

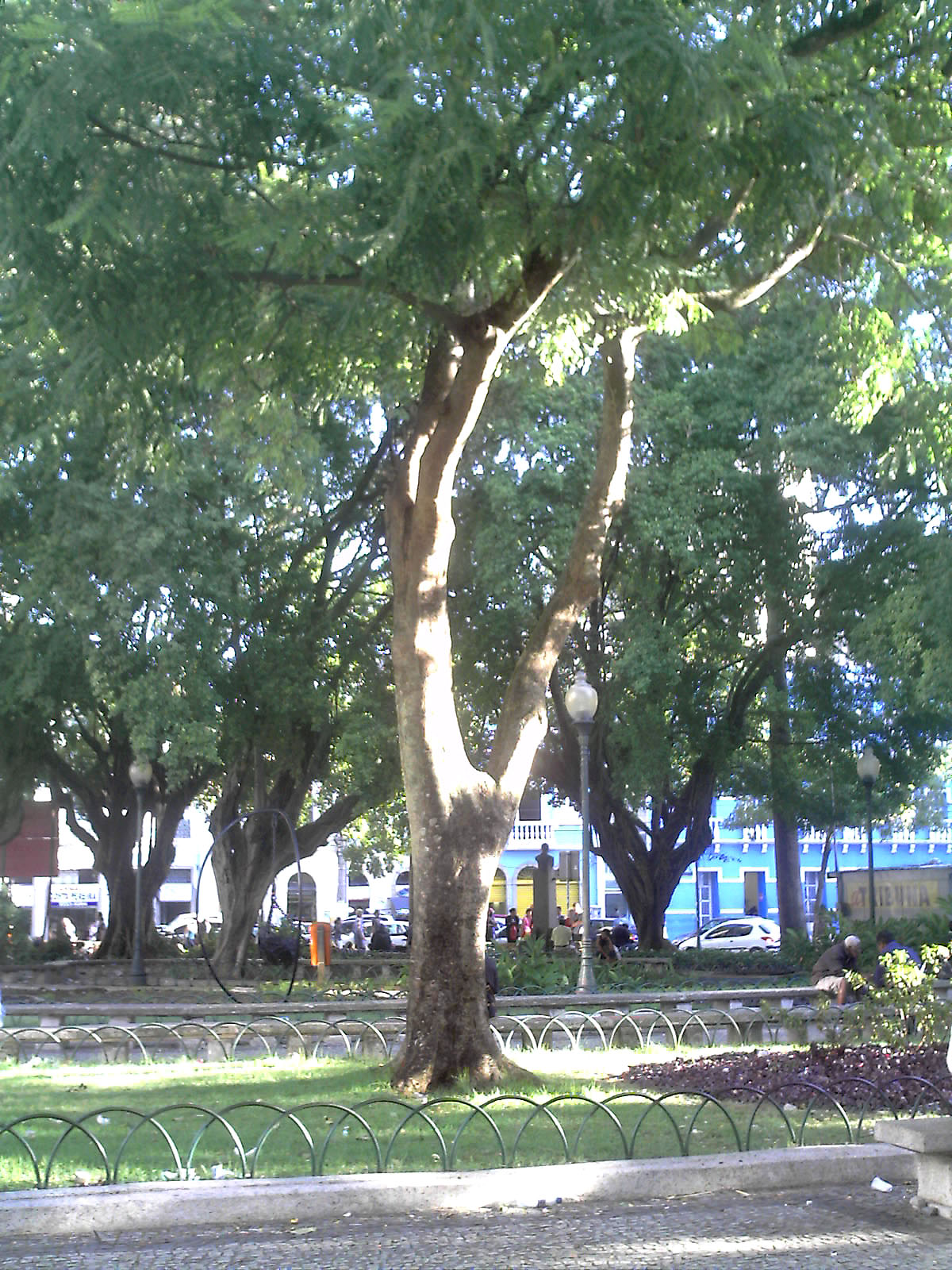
The brazilwood tree, which gives Brazil its name, has dark, valuable wood and provides red dye

As Cabral realized that no one in his convoy spoke the language of the indigenous people in Brazil, he took every effort to avoid violence and conflict and used music and humor as forms of communication. Just a few months before Cabral landed, Spanish navigator Vicente Yáñez Pinzón came to the northeastern coast of Brazil and deployed many armed men ashore with no means of communicating with the indigenous people. One of his ships and captains was captured by indigenous people and eight of his men were killed. Cabral no doubt learned from this to treat communication with the utmost priority. Cabral left two degredados (criminal exiles) in Brazil to learn the native languages and to serve as interpreters in the future. The practice of leaving degredados in new lands to serve as interpreters came straight from the colonization of the islands off of the West African coast 80 years before Cabral landed in Brazil.

After Cabral's voyage, the Portuguese focused their efforts on their possessions in Africa and India and showed little interest in Brazil. Between 1500 and 1530, relatively few Portuguese expeditions came to the new land to chart the coast and to obtain brazilwood. In Europe, this wood was used to produce a valuable red dye to luxury textiles. To extract brazilwood from the tropical rainforest, the Portuguese and other Europeans relied on the work of the natives, who initially worked in exchange for European goods like mirrors, scissors, knives and axes.

In this early stage of the colonization of Brazil, and also later, the Portuguese frequently relied on the help of Europeans who lived together with the indigenous people and knew their languages and culture. The most famous of these were João Ramalho, who lived among the Guaianaz tribe near today's São Paulo, and Diogo Álvares Correia, who acquired the name Caramuru, who lived among the Tupinambá natives near today's Salvador.

Over time, the Portuguese realized that some European countries, especially France, were also sending excursions to the land to extract brazilwood. Worried about foreign incursions and hoping to find mineral riches, the Portuguese crown decided to send large missions to take possession of the land and fight the French. In 1530, an expedition led by Martim Afonso de Sousa arrived in Brazil to patrol the entire coast, expel the French, and create the first colonial villages like São Vicente on the coast.

== Structure of colonization ==
Because Brazil was not home to larger civilizations like the Aztec and the Inca in Mexico and Peru, the Portuguese could not place themselves on an established social structure. This, coupled with the fact that tangible material wealth was not found until the 18th century, made the relationship between the Portuguese and the Brazilian colony very different from the relationship of the Spanish to their possessions in the Americas. For example, the Brazilian colony was at first thought of as a commercial asset that would facilitate trade between the Portuguese and India and not a place to be settled to develop a society.

The social model of conquest in Brazil was one geared toward commerce and entrepreneurial ideals rather than conquest as was the case in the Spanish realm. As time progressed, the Portuguese crown found that having the colony serve as a trading post was not ideal for regulating land claims in the Americas, so it decided that the best way to keep control of their land was to settle it. Thus, the land was divided into fifteen private, hereditary captaincies, the most successful of which being Pernambuco and São Vicente. Pernambuco succeeded by growing sugarcane. São Vicente prospered by enslaving indigenous native people from the land. The other thirteen captaincies failed, leading the king to make colonization a royal effort rather than a private one.

In 1549, Tomé de Sousa sailed to Brazil to establish a central government. He brought along Jesuit priests, who set up missions, forbidding natives to express their own cultures, and converting many to Catholicism. The Jesuits' work to dominate the indigenous native’s cultural expression and way of living helped the Portuguese expel the French from a colony they had established at present-day Rio de Janeiro.

=== Captaincies ===
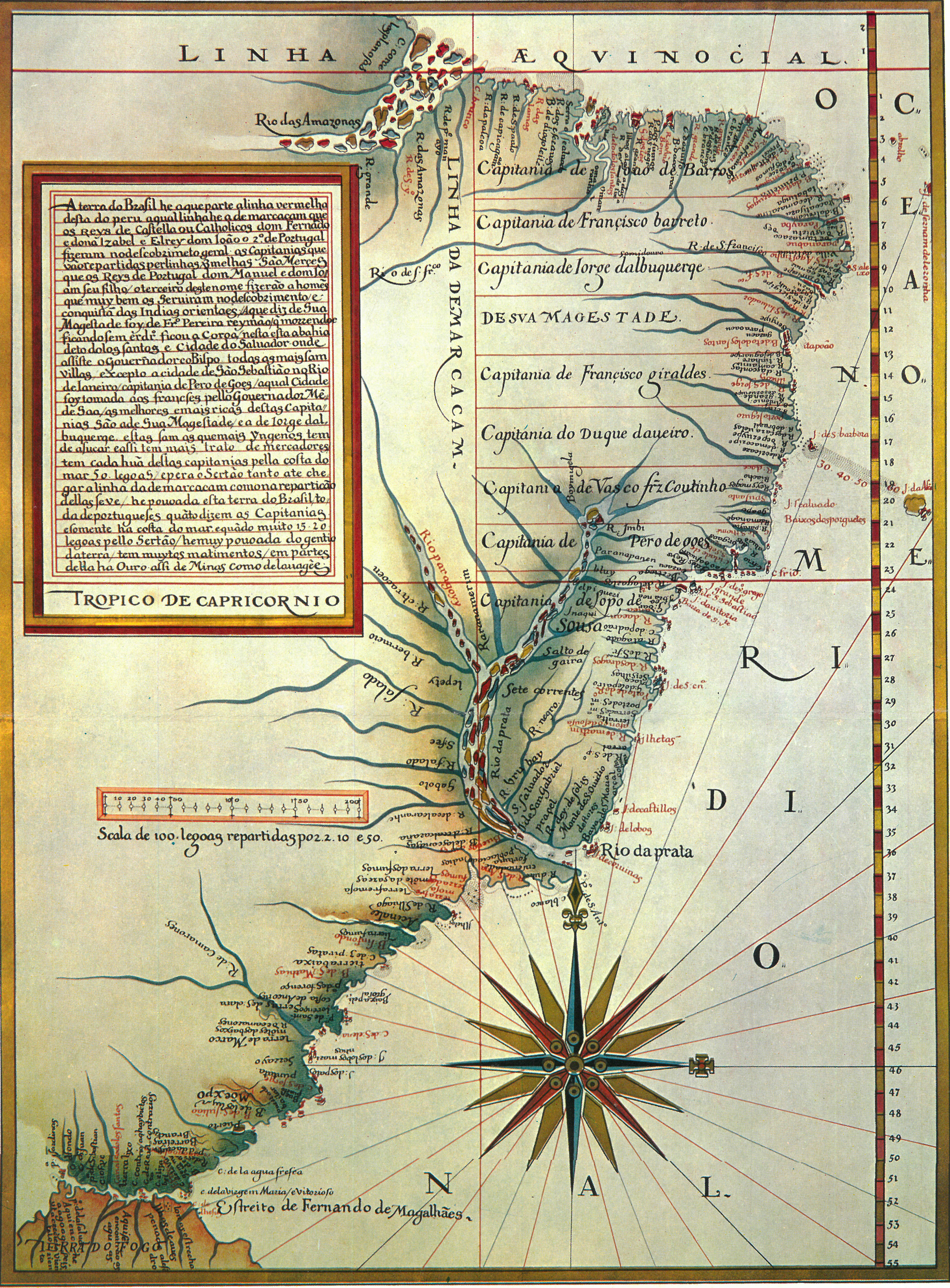
Portuguese map (1574) by Luís Teixeira, showing the location of the hereditary captaincies of Brazil

The first attempt to colonize Brazil followed the system of hereditary captaincies (Capitanias Hereditárias), which had previously been used successfully in the colonization of Madeira. These captaincies were granted by royal decree to private owners, namely to merchants, soldiers, sailors, and petty nobility, saving the Portuguese crown from the high costs of colonization. The captaincies granted control over large areas of land and all that resided upon it. Furthermore, the splitting of land highlights the economic importance a large amount of land would have for red-dye producing trees and sugar plantations. Thus, between 1534 and 1536 king John III divided the land into 15 captaincy colonies, which were given to those who wanted and had the means to administer and explore them. The captains were granted ample powers to administer and profit from their possessions.

From the 15 original captaincies, only two, Pernambuco and São Vicente, prospered. The failure of most captaincies was related to the resistance of the indigenous native people, shipwrecks and internal disputes between the colonizers. Failure can also be attributed to the Crown not having a strong administrative hold due to Brazil's reliance on its exportation economy. Pernambuco, the most successful captaincy, belonged to Duarte Coelho, who founded the city of Olinda in 1536. His captaincy prospered with engenhos, sugarcane mills, installed after 1542 producing sugar. Sugar was a very valuable good in Europe, and its production became the main Brazilian colonial product for the next 150 years. The captaincy of São Vicente, owned by Martim Afonso de Sousa, also produced sugar but its main economic activity was capturing indigenous native people to trade them as slaves.

=== Governors General ===
With the failure of most captaincies and the menacing presence of French ships along the Brazilian coast, the government of king John III decided to turn the colonization of Brazil back into a royal enterprise. In 1549, a large fleet led by Tomé de Sousa set sail to Brazil to establish a central government in the colony. Tomé de Sousa, the first Governor-General of Brazil, brought detailed instructions, prepared by the king's aides, about how to administer and foster the development of the colony. His first act was the foundation of the capital city, Salvador, in northeastern Brazil, in today's state of Bahia. The city was built on a slope by a bay (All Saints Bay) and was divided into an upper administrative area and a lower commercial area with a harbour. Tomé de Sousa also visited the captaincies to repair the villages and reorganise their economies. In 1551, the Diocese of São Salvador da Bahia was established in the colony, with its seat in Salvador.

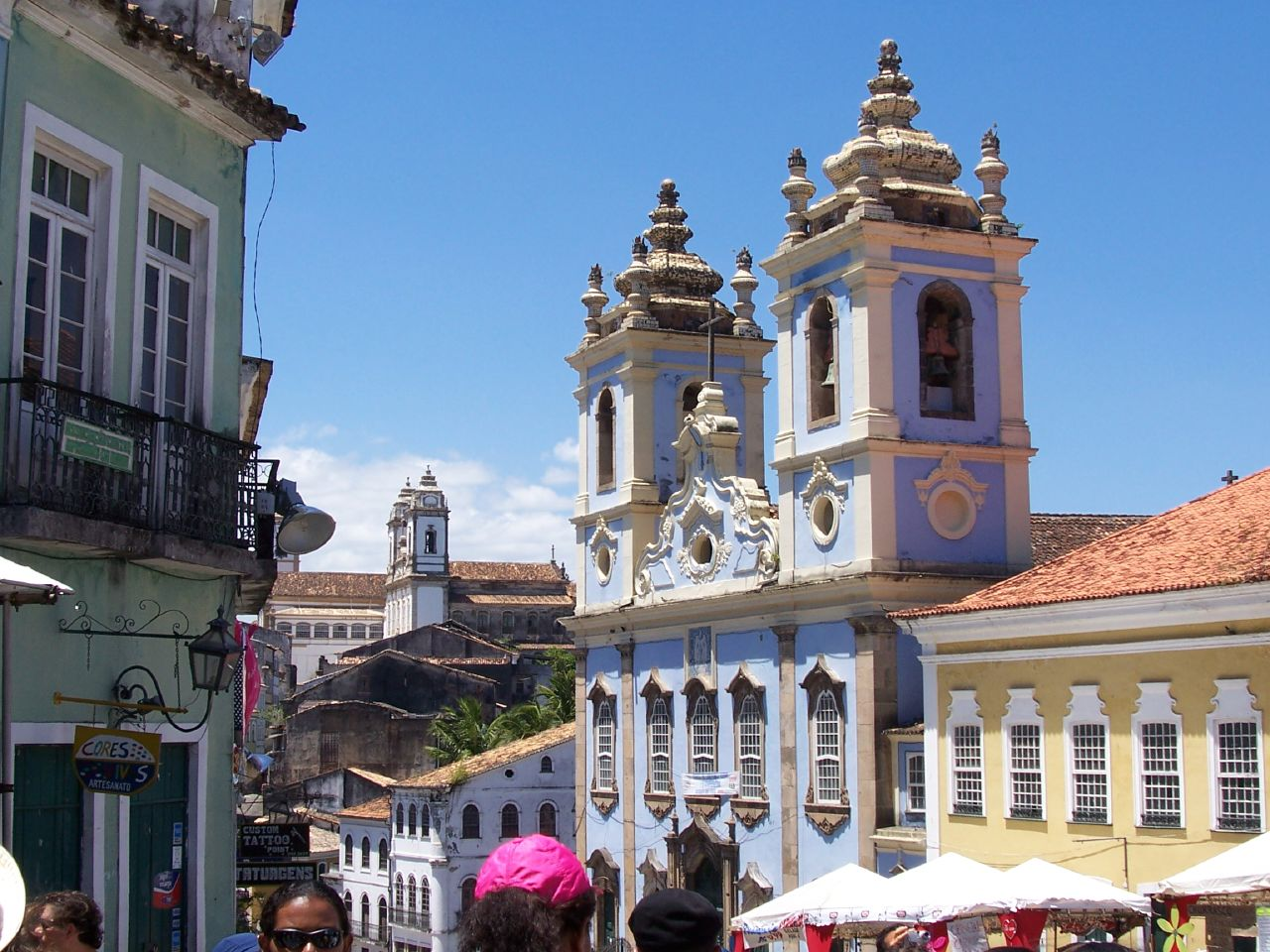
Historical centre of Salvador in 2007 – the architecture of the city's historic centre is typically Portuguese.

The second Governor General, Duarte da Costa (1553–1557), faced conflicts with the indigenous people and severe disputes with other colonizers and the bishop. Wars against the natives around Salvador consumed much of his government. The fact that the first bishop of Brazil, Pero Fernandes Sardinha, was killed and eaten by the Caeté natives after a shipwreck in 1556 illustrates how strained the situation was between the Portuguese and many indigenous communities.

The third Governor-General of Brazil was Mem de Sá (1557–1573). He was an efficient administrator who managed to defeat the indigenous people and, with the help of the Jesuits, expel the French (Huguenots and some previous Catholic settlers) from their colony of France Antarctique. As part of this process, his nephew, Estácio de Sá, founded the city of Rio de Janeiro there in 1565.

The huge size of Brazil led to the colony being divided in two after 1621 when king Philip II created the states of Brasil, with Salvador as capital, and Maranhão, with its capital in São Luís. The state of Maranhão was still further divided in 1737 into the Maranhão e Piauí and Grão-Pará e Rio Negro, with its capital in Belém do Pará. Each state had its own Governor.

After 1640, the governors of Brazil coming from the high nobility started to use the title of Vice-rei (Viceroy). In 1763 the capital of the State of Brazil was transferred from Salvador to Rio de Janeiro. In 1775 all Brazilian States (Brasil, Maranhão and Grão-Pará) were unified into the Viceroyalty of Brazil, with Rio de Janeiro as capital, and the title of the king's representative was officially changed to that of Viceroy of Brazil.

As in Portugal, each colonial village and city had a city council (câmara municipal), whose members were prominent figures of colonial society (land owners, merchants, slave traders). Colonial city councils were responsible for regulating commerce, public infrastructure, professional artisans, prisons etc.

=== Jesuit missions ===
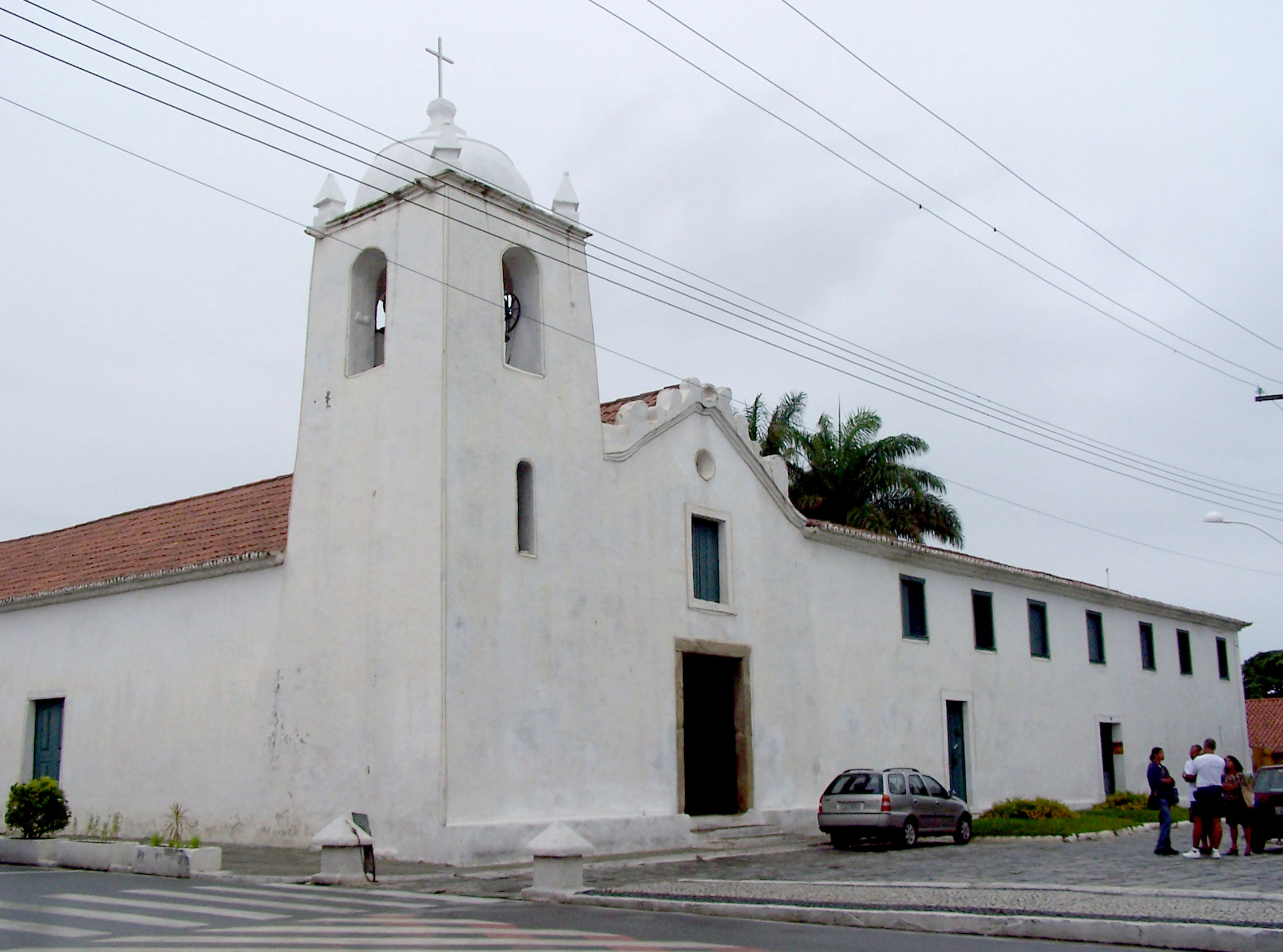
17th-century Jesuit church in São Pedro da Aldeia, near Rio de Janeiro

Tomé de Sousa, first Governor General of Brazil, brought the first group of Jesuits to the colony. More than any other religious order, the Jesuits represented the spiritual side of the enterprise and were destined to play a central role in the colonial history of Brazil. The spreading of the Catholic faith was an important justification for the Portuguese conquests, and the Jesuits were officially supported by the king, who instructed Tomé de Sousa to give them all the support needed to Christianise the indigenous people.

The first Jesuits, guided by Father Manuel da Nóbrega and including prominent figures like Juan de Azpilcueta Navarro, Leonardo Nunes and later Joseph of Anchieta, established the first Jesuit missions in Salvador and in São Paulo dos Campos de Piratininga, the settlement that gave rise to the city of São Paulo. Nóbrega and Anchieta were instrumental in the defeat of the French colonists of France Antarctique by managing to pacify the Tamoio natives, who had previously fought the Portuguese. The Jesuits took part in the foundation of the city of Rio de Janeiro in 1565.

The success of the Jesuits in converting the indigenous people to Catholicism is linked to their capacity to understand the native culture, especially the language. The first grammar of the Tupi language was compiled by Joseph of Anchieta and printed in Coimbra in 1595. The Jesuits often gathered the aborigines into communities of resettlement called aldeias, similar in intent to the reductions implemented by Francisco de Toledo in southern Peru during the 1560s. where the natives worked for the community and were evangelized. Founded in the aftermath of the campaign undertaken by Mem de Sá from 1557 to force the submission of Salvadoran natives, the aldeias marked the transition of Jesuit policy from conversion by persuasion alone to the acceptance of force as a means of organizing natives with a means to then evangelizing them. Nevertheless, these aldeias were unattractive to the natives due to the introduction of epidemic diseases to the communities, the forced settlement of aldeia natives elsewhere to labor, and raiding of the aldeias by colonists eager to steal laborers for themselves thus causing natives to flee the settlements. The aldeia model would again be used, though also unsuccessfully, by the Governor of the captaincy of São Paulo, Luís António de Sousa Botelho Mourão, in 1765, in order to encourage mestizos, natives, and mulattoes to abandon slash-and-burn agriculture and adopt a sedentary farming lifestyle.

The Jesuits had frequent disputes with other colonists who wanted to enslave the natives, but also with the hierarchy of the Catholic Church itself. Following the creation of the Roman Catholic Archdiocese of São Salvador da Bahia by the Pope, Bishop Pero Fernandes Sardinha arrived in Bahia in 1552 and took issue with the Jesuit mission led by Manoel da Nóbrega. Sardinha opposed the Jesuits taking part in indigenous dances and playing indigenous instruments since he viewed these activities had little effect on conversion. The use of interpreters at confession by the Jesuits was also railed against by Sardinha who opposed the appropriation of indigenous culture for evangelization. Sardinha also challenged the Jesuit prohibition on waging war against and enslaving the indigenous population, eventually forcing Nóbrega to leave Bahia for the Jesuit mission at São Vicente in late 1552 to return only at the conclusion of the Sardinha's tenure. The action of the Jesuits saved many natives from slavery, but also disturbed their ancestral way of life and inadvertently helped spread infectious diseases against which the aborigines had no natural defenses. Slave labour and trade were essential for the economy of Brazil and other American colonies, and the Jesuits usually did not object to the enslavement of African people.

=== French incursions ===
The potential riches of tropical Brazil led the French, who did not recognize the Tordesillas Treaty that divided the world between the Spanish and the Portuguese, to attempt to colonize parts of Brazil. In 1555, the Nicolas Durand de Villegaignon founded a settlement within Guanabara Bay, in an island in front of today's Rio de Janeiro. The colony, named France Antarctique, led to conflict with Governor General Mem de Sá, who waged war against the colony in 1560. Estácio de Sá, nephew of the Governor, founded Rio de Janeiro in 1565 and managed to expel the last French settlers in 1567. Jesuit priests Manuel da Nóbrega and Joseph of Anchieta were instrumental in the Portuguese victory by pacifying the natives who supported the French.

Another French colony, France Équinoxiale, was founded in 1612 in present-day São Luís, in the North of Brazil. In 1614 the French were again expelled from São Luís by the Portuguese.

== The sugar age (1530–1700) ==
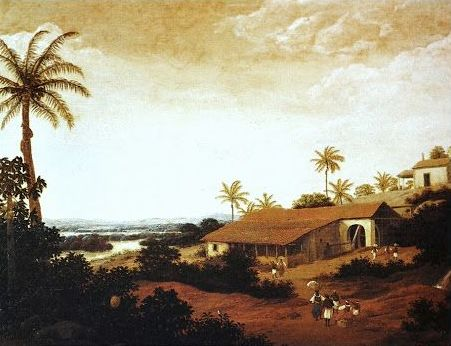
View of a sugar-producing farm (engenho) in colonial Pernambuco by Dutch painter Frans Post (17th century)

Since the initial attempts to find gold and silver failed, the Portuguese colonists adopted an economy based on the production of agricultural goods that were to be exported to Europe. Tobacco and cotton and some other agricultural goods were produced, but sugar became by far the most important Brazilian colonial product until the early 18th century. The first sugarcane farms were established in the mid-16th century and were the key for the success of the captaincies of São Vicente and Pernambuco, leading sugarcane plantations to quickly spread to other coastal areas in colonial Brazil. Initially, the Portuguese attempted to utilize Indian slaves for sugar cultivation, but shifted to the use of black African slave labor. While the availability of Amerindians did decrease due to epidemics afflicting the coastal native population and the declaration of king Sebastian I's 1570 law which proclaimed the liberty of Brazilian natives, the enslavement of indigenous people increased after 1570. A new slave trade emerged where indigenous people were brought from the sertões or "inland wilderness frontiers" by mixed-race mameluco under the loophole in the 1570 law that they were captured in just wars against native groups who "customarily" attacked the Portuguese. By 1580, as many as 40,000 natives could have been taken from the interior to toil as slaves on Brazil's interior, and this enslavement of indigenous people continued right throughout the colonial period.

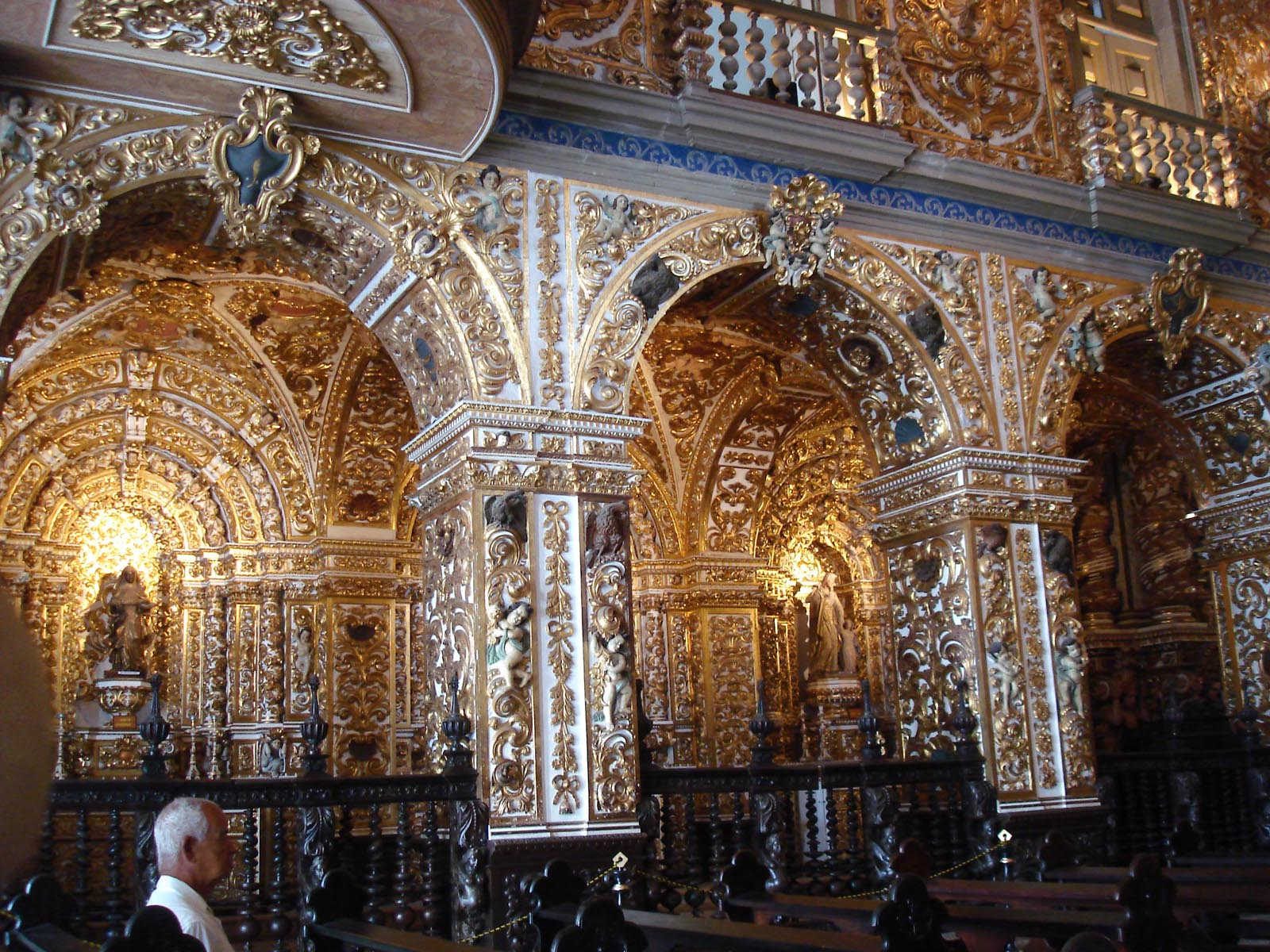
Golden Baroque inner decoration of the Franciscan church of Salvador (first half of the 18th century)

The period of sugar-based economy (1530 – c. 1700) is known as the sugar cycle in Brazil. The development of the sugar complex occurred over time, with a variety of models. The dependencies of the farm included a casa-grande (big house) where the owner of the farm lived with his family, and the senzala, where the slaves were kept. A notable early study of this complex is by Brazilian sociologist Gilberto Freyre. This arrangement was depicted in engravings and paintings by Frans Post as a feature of an apparently harmonious society.

Initially, the Portuguese relied on enslaved Amerindians to work on sugarcane harvesting and processing, but they soon began importing enslaved Africans from West Africa, though the enslavement of indigenous people continued. The Portuguese had established several commercial facilities in West Africa, where West African slaves were bought from African slave traders. The enslaved West Africans were then sent via slave ships to Brazil, chained and in crowded conditions. Enslaved West Africans were more desirable and practical because many came from sedentary, agriculture-based societies and did not require as much training in how to farm as did members of Amerindian societies, which tended to not be primarily agricultural. Africans were also less vulnerable to disease than Amerindians were. The importation of enslaved Africans into Brazil was heavily influenced by the rise of sugar and gold industries in the colony; from 1600 until 1650, sugar accounted for 95% of Brazil's exports.

Slave labor demands varied based on region and on the type of harvest crop. In the Bahia region, where sugar was the main crop, conditions for enslaved peoples were extremely harsh. It was often cheaper for slaveowners to literally work enslaved peoples to death over the course of a few years and replace them with newly imported enslaved people. Areas where manioc, a subsistence crop, was cultivated also utilized high numbers of enslaved peoples. In these areas, 40 to 60 percent of the population was enslaved. These regions were characterized by fewer work demands and better living and working conditions for enslaved peoples as compared to labor conditions for enslaved populations in sugar regions.

The Portuguese attempted to severely restrict colonial trade, meaning that Brazil was only allowed to export and import goods from Portugal and other Portuguese colonies. Brazil exported sugar, tobacco, cotton and native products and imported from Portugal wine, olive oil, textiles and luxury goods – the latter imported by Portugal from other European countries. Africa played an essential role as the supplier of slaves, and Brazilian slave traders in Africa frequently exchanged cachaça, a distilled spirit derived from sugarcane, and shells, for slaves. This comprised what is now known as the triangular trade between Europe, Africa and the Americas during the colonial period.

Merchants during the sugar age were crucial to the economic development of the colony, the link between the sugar production areas, coastal Portuguese cities, and Europe. Merchants in the early came from many nations, including Germans, Flemings, and Italians, but Portuguese merchants came to dominate the trade in Brazil. During the union of the Spanish and Portuguese crowns (1580–1640), to be active in Spanish America as well, especially trading African slaves.

Even though Brazilian sugar was reputed as being of high quality, the industry faced a crisis during the 17th and 18th centuries when the Dutch and the French started producing sugar in the Antilles, located much closer to Europe, causing sugar prices to fall.

=== Cities and towns ===
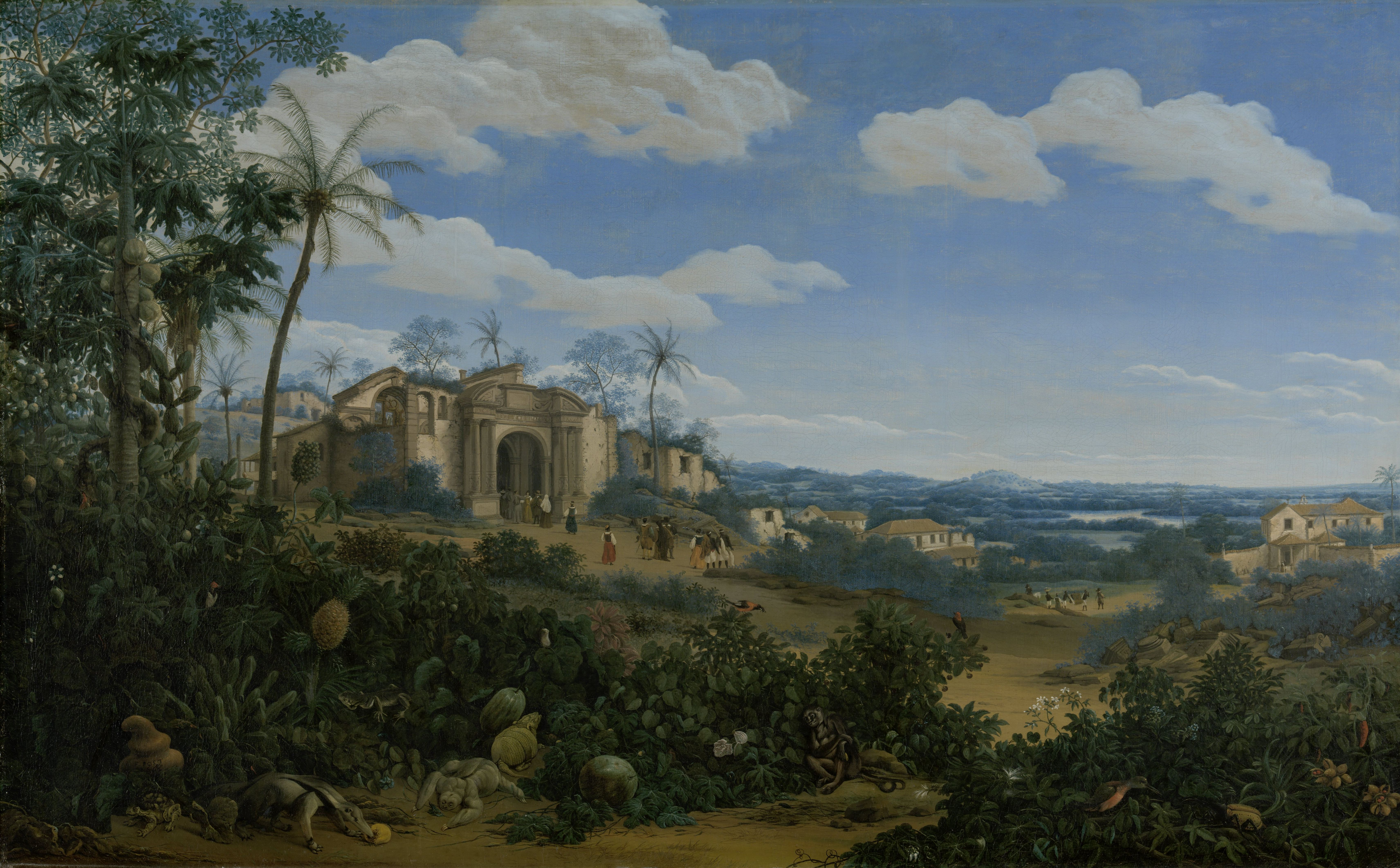
View of Olinda, c. 1660, Frans Post

Brazil had coastal cities and towns, which have been considered far less important than colonial settlements in Spanish America, but like Spanish America, urban settlements were important as the sites of institutional life of church and state, as well as urban groups of merchants. Unlike many areas of Spanish America, there was no dense, sedentary indigenous population which had already created settlements, but cities and towns in Brazil were similar to those in Spanish Colonial Venezuela. Port cities allowed Portuguese trade goods to enter, including African slaves, and export goods of sugar and later gold and coffee to be exported to Portugal and beyond. Coastal cities of Olinda (founded 1537), Salvador (1549), Santos (1545), Vitória (1551), and Rio de Janeiro (1565) were also vital in the defense against pirates. Only São Paulo was an important inland city. Unlike the network of towns and cities that developed in most areas of Spanish America, the coastal cities and their hinterlands were oriented toward Portugal directly with little connection otherwise. With sugar as the major export commodity in the early period and the necessity to process cane into exportable refined sugar on-site, the sugar engenhos had resident artisans and barber-surgeons, and functioned in some ways as small towns. Also unlike most Spanish settlements, Brazilian cities and towns did not have a uniform lay-out of central plaza and a check board pattern of streets, often because the topography defeated such an orderly layout.

=== New Christians ===
Converted Jews, so-called New Christians, many of whom were merchants, played a role in colonial Brazil. Their "importance in the colonial may be one explanation why the Inquisition was not permanently established in Brazil during the Iberian Union." New Christians were well integrated into institutional life, serving in civil as well as ecclesiastical offices. The relative lack of persecution and abundance of opportunity allowed them to have a significant place in society. With the Iberian Union (1580–1640), many migrated to Spanish America.

=== The Iberian Union (1580–1640) ===
Coat of arms of Philip II and I of Spain and Portugal, inserting the coat of arms of Portugal over those of Castile and León and Aragon

In 1580, a succession crisis led to the union of Portugal and Spain being ruled by the Habsburg king Philip II. The unification of the crowns of the two Iberian kingdoms, known as the Iberian Union, lasted until 1640 when the Portuguese revolted. During the union the institutions of both kingdoms remained separate. For Portuguese merchants, many of whom were Christian converts from Judaism ("New Christians") or their descendants, the union of crowns presented commercial opportunities in the slave trade to Spanish America. The Seventeen Provinces obtained independence from Spain in 1581, leading Philip II to prohibit commerce with Dutch ships, including in Brazil. Since the Dutch had invested large sums in financing sugar production in the Brazilian Northeast and were important as shippers of sugar, a conflict began with Dutch privateers plundering the coast: they sacked Salvador in 1604, from which they removed large amounts of gold and silver before a joint Spanish-Portuguese fleet recaptured the town. The city was captured again by the Dutch in May 1624 before being surrendered to a Luso-Spanish armada 11 months later.

=== Dutch rule in northeastern Brazil, 1630–1654 ===
From 1630 to 1654, the Dutch set up more permanently in commercial Recife and aristocratic Olinda. With the capture of Paraíba in 1635, the Dutch controlled a long stretch of the coast most accessible to Europe (Dutch Brazil), without, however, penetrating the interior. The large Dutch ships were unable to moor in the coastal inlets where lighter Portuguese shipping came and went. Ironically, the result of the Dutch capture of the sugar coast was a higher price of sugar in Amsterdam. During the Nieuw Holland episode, the colonists of the Dutch West India Company in Brazil were in a constant state of siege, in spite of the presence of the count John Maurice of Nassau as governor (1637–1644) in Recife (renamed Mauritstaad). Nassau invited scientific commissions to research the local flora and fauna, resulting in added knowledge of the territory. Moreover, he set up a city project for Recife and Olinda, which was partially accomplished. Remnants survive into the modern era. After several years of open warfare, the Dutch finally withdrew in 1654; the Portuguese paid off a war debt in payments of salt. Few Dutch cultural and ethnic influences remain, but Albert Eckhout's paintings of amerindians and slaves, as well as his still lifes are important works of baroque art.

=== Slavery in Brazil ===
Unlike neighboring Spanish America, Brazil was a slave society from its outset. The African slave trade was inherent to the economic and social structure of the colony. Years before the North American slave trade got underway, more slaves had been brought to Brazil than would ever reach the Thirteen Colonies. It can be estimated that around 35% of all Africans captured in the Atlantic slave trade were sent to Brazil. The slave trade in Brazil would continue for nearly two hundred years and last the longest of any country in the Americas. African slaves had a higher monetary value than indigenous slaves largely because many of them came from agricultural societies and thus were already familiar with the work needed to maintain the profitable sugar plantations of Brazil. Also, African slaves were already immune to several of the Old World diseases that killed many indigenous people and were less likely to flee, as compared to indigenous slaves, since their place of origin was so inaccessible. However, many African slaves did in fact flee and created their own communities of runaway slaves called quilombos, which often became established political and economic entities.

=== Runaway slave settlements ===
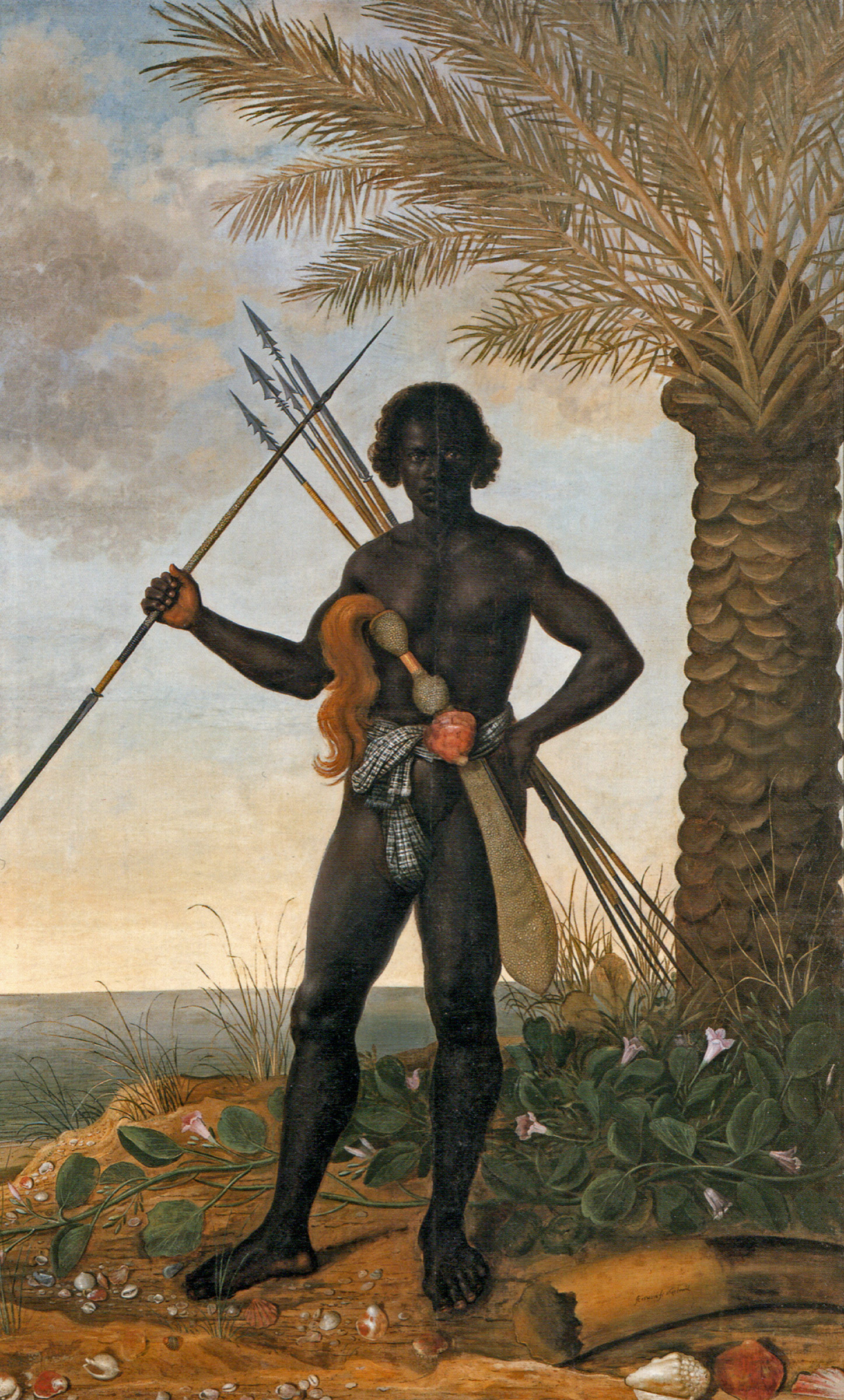
Albert Eckhout, African warrior at the time of Ganga Zumba and leader of the Palmares quilombo

Work on the sugarcane plantations in Northeast Brazil and other areas relied heavily on slave labor, mostly of west African origin. These enslaved people worked to resist slavery in many ways. Some of the most common forms of resistance involved engaging in sluggishness and sabotage. Other ways these enslaved peoples resisted was by exacting violence upon themselves and their babies, often to the point of death, and by seeking revenge against their masters. Another type of resistance to slavery was flight and, with the dense vegetation of the tropics, runaway slaves fled in numbers and for slave owners, this was an "endemic problem." The realities of being on a frontier that was policed in less than optimal ways fostered the successful escapes of enslaved people. Since the early 17th century there are indications of runaway slaves organizing themselves into settlements in the Brazilian hinterland. These settlements, called mocambos and quilombos, were usually small and relatively close to sugar fields, and attracted not only African slaves but also people of indigenous origin.

Quilombos were often viewed by Portuguese colonists as "parasitic," relying upon theft of livestock and crops, "extortion, and sporadic raiding" for sustenance. Often, the victims of this raiding were not white sugar planters but blacks who sold produce grown on their own plots. Other accounts document the actions of members of quilombos to successfully prospect gold and diamonds and to engage in trade with white-controlled cities.

While the reasons for fugitive settlement are varied, quilombos were rarely wholly self-sufficient and although inhabitants may have engaged in agricultural pursuits, they depended on a kind of parasitic economy where proximity to settled areas were usually prerequisites for their long-term success. Unlike the palenque in Spanish America or maroon settlements in the West Indies, Portuguese officials rebuked any kind of agreements to standardize the quilombos out of the fear of drawing even more fugitive slaves to their communities. The largest of the quilombos was the Quilombo dos Palmares, located in today's Alagoas state, which grew to many thousands during the disruption of Portuguese rule with the Dutch incursion. Palmares was governed by leaders Ganga Zumba and his successor, Zumbi. The terminology for the settlements and leaders come directly from Angola, with quilombo, an Angolan word for military villages of diverse settlers, and the nganga a nzumbi "was the priest responsible for the spiritual defense of the community." The Dutch and later the Portuguese attempted several times to conquer Palmares, until an army led by famed São Paulo-born Domingos Jorge Velho managed to destroy the great quilombo and kill Zumbi in 1695. Brazilian feature film director Carlos Diegues made a film about Palmares called simply Quilombo. Of the many quilombos that once existed in Brazil, some have survived to this day as isolated rural communities.

Portuguese colonists sought to destroy these fugitive communities because they threatened the economic and social order of the slave regime in Brazil. There was a constant fear among colonists that enslaved peoples would revolt and resist slavery. Two settler objectives were to discourage enslaved peoples from trying to escape and to close down their options for escape. Strategies used by Portuguese colonists to prevent enslaved people from fleeing included apprehending escapees before they had the opportunity to band together. Slave catchers mounted expeditions with the intent to destroy fugitive communities. These expeditions destroyed mocambos and either killed or re-enslaved inhabitants These expeditions were conducted by soldiers and mercenaries, many of whom were supported by local people or by the government's military. As a result, many fugitive communities were heavily fortified. Amerindians were sometimes utilized as ‘slave catchers’ or as part of a larger set of defenses against slave uprisings that had been orchestrated by cities and towns. At the same time, some Amerindians resisted the colonizers’ efforts to prevent uprisings by surreptitiously incorporating into their villages those who had escaped slavery.

Many of the details surrounding the inner political and social structure of the quilombos remain a mystery, and the information available today is limited by the fact that it usually comes from colonial accounts of their destruction. More is known about the Quilombo dos Palmares because it was "the longest-lived and largest fugitive community" in Colonial Brazil. Like any polity, Palmares and other quilombos changed over time. Quilombos drew on both African and European influences, often emulating the realities of colonial society in Brazil. In Palmares, slavery, which also existed in Africa, continued. Quilombos, like plantations, were most likely composed of people from different African groups. Religious syncretism, combining African and Christian elements, was prevalent. The Bahian quilombo of Buraco de Tatu is described as a "well-organized" village in which people probably practiced monogamy and lived on rectangular-shaped houses that made up neat rows, emulating a plantation senzala. Quilombos were often well fortified, with swampy dikes and false roads leading to "covered traps" and "sharpened stakes," like those used in Africa. The gender imbalance among African slaves was a result of the planters' preference for male labor, and men in quilombos not only raided for crops and goods, but for women; the women taken back to the quilombos were often black or mulatto.

In Minas Gerais, the mining economy particularly favored the formation of quilombos. The skilled slaves that worked in mines were highly valuable to their owners, but, as long as they continued to cede their findings, they were often allowed freedom of movement within the mining districts. Slaves and freed blacks made up to three-fourths of the region's population, and runaways could easily hide among the "sea of coloreds." The region's mountains and large tracts of unsettled land provided potential hideouts. Civil unrest combined with other forms of resistance against the colonial government severely hindered the anti-quilombo efforts of slaveowners and local authorities. In fact, to the dismay of colonial authorities, slaves participated in these anti-government movements, often armed by their owners.

As mentioned, indigenous people could be both allies and enemies of runaway slaves. From the late 1500s and as late as 1627, in southern Bahia, a "syncretic Messianic religion" called Santidade gained popularity among both indigenous people and runaway slaves, who joined forces and carried out raids in the region, even stealing slaves from Salvador.

== Inland expansion: the entradas and bandeiras ==
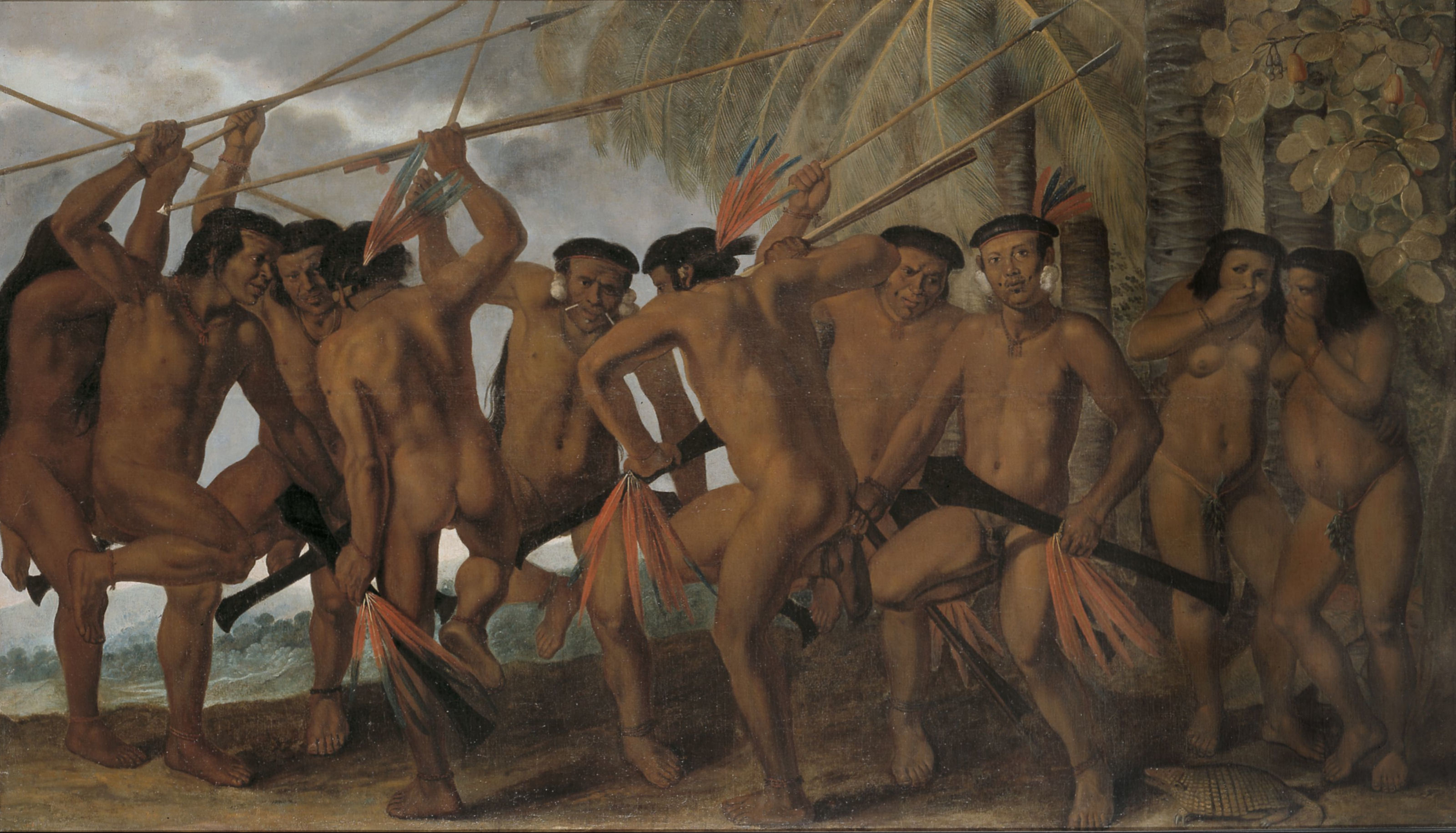
Albert Eckhout Tapuias dancing, mid. 17th century

Since the 16th century the exploration of the Brazilian inland was attempted several times, mostly to try to find mineral riches like the silver mines found in 1546 by the Spanish in Potosí (now in Bolivia). Since no riches were initially found, colonisation was restricted to the coast where the climate and soil were suitable for sugarcane plantations.

Key to understanding inland expansion in Brazil is understanding the colony's economic structure. Brazil was constructed as an export colony, and less so as a place for permanent European settlement. This led to a culture of extraction that was unsustainable in terms of land and labor uses.

At sugar plantations in the north, land was worked exhaustively with no concern for ensuring its long-term productivity. As soon as the land was exhausted, plantation owners would simply abandon their plots, shifting the sugar frontier to new plots as the supply of land seemed endless to them. Economic incentives to increase profits drove this pattern of planting, while the abandoned lands rarely recovered.

The expeditions to inland Brazil are divided into two types: the entradas and the bandeiras. The entradas were done in the name of the Portuguese crown and were financed by the colonial government. Its main objective was to find mineral riches, as well as to explore and chart unknown territory. The bandeiras, on the other hand, were private initiatives sponsored and carried out mostly by settlers of the São Paulo region (the Paulistas). The expeditions of the bandeirantes, as these adventurers were called, were aimed at obtaining native slaves for trade and finding mineral riches. Banderia expeditions often consisted of a field officer, his slaves, a chaplain, a scribe, a mapmaker, white colonists, livestock, and medical professionals, among others. In several-month-long marches, such groups entered lands that were not yet occupied by colonizers by were doubtless part of the homelands of Amerindians. The bandeirantes, who at the time were mostly of mixed Portuguese and native ancestry, knew all the old indigenous pathways (the peabirus) through the Brazilian inland and were acclimated to the harsh conditions of these journeys.

At the end of the 17th century, the bandeirantes' expeditions discovered gold in central Brazil, in the region of Minas Gerais, which started a gold rush that led to a dramatic urban development of inland Brazil during the 18th century. Additionally, inland expeditions led to westward expansion of the frontiers of colonial Brazil, beyond the limits established by the Treaty of Tordesillas.

=== Race mixing and cultural exchange along the frontier ===
When white fugitives fleeing tax collectors, military enlistment, and the law entered the backlands of the Atlantic Forest, they formed racially-mixed settlements that became sites of "cultural and genetic exchange".

Some tribes like the Caiapo managed to fend off the Europeans for years, while adopting Old World agricultural practices. However, the expansion of the mining frontier pushed many indigenous tribes off their land. An increasing number of them went to the aldeias to evade the threat of enslavement by colonists or conflicts with other indigenous groups. In 1755, in an attempt to transform this wandering population into a more productive, assimilated peasantry modeled on Europe's own peasants, the marquis of Pombal abolished the enslavement of natives and legal discrimination against the Europeans who married them, banning the use of the term caboclo, a pejorative used to refer to a mestizo or a detribalized indigenous person.

Along the frontier, racial mixing between people of indigenous, European, and African ancestry resulted in various physical spaces for cultural interchange that historian Warren Dean has called the "caboclo frontier". Portuguese colonial authorities were characterized by their refusal to cooperate or negotiate with quilombos, seeing them as a threat to the social order, but caboclo settlements integrated the indigenous into what Darren describes as "neo-European customs [or an Africanized version of them]". Runaway slaves, forming quilombos or finding refuge in the backlands of the forest, came into contact with indigenous people and introduced them to the Portuguese language. Frontier army agent Guido Thomaz Marlière noted: "a fugitive black can accomplish more among the Indians than all the missionaries together..." One quilombo in specific, Piolho, was "officially tolerated" for its ability to pacify indigenous tribes. At the same time, colonial officials disapproved of unions between runaway black slaves and indigenous people. In 1771, when an indigenous captain-major of an aldeia married an African woman, he was dismissed from his position.

The inhabitants of the caboclo frontier exchanged belief systems, musical traditions, remedies, fishing and hunting techniques, and other customs with each other. The Tupi language enriched Portuguese with new words for native flora and fauna, as well as for places. Africanisms, such as the Kimbundu word fubá (maize meal) also became part of Brazilian Portuguese.

==== Black Irmandade of Bahia, Brazil ====
The Black Irmandade was the result of the blacks and mulattos beginning to create custom and culture. Although Blacks were considered of "the lowest rabble", their agricultural skills and that they came from Europe along with the white Europeans gave them an upper hand in social ranking. These Afro-Portuguese blacks developed a complex culture that can best be highlighted through their celebrations and festivities that took place in Bahia, Brazil. In these festivities lies a combination of African beliefs and practices with not only a Christian impact but also the impact of living in a new land. The Irmandade put a large value on the extensiveness of one's burial as to die alone and "anonymously" would be a representation of a poor person. The Irmandade of Bahia, Brazil, highlights the rising racial and cultural complexity that would take place between the native indigenous, African slaves, and white Europeans in the years to come.

== Initial findings of gold (17th century) ==
While the first major gold deposits were found at the end of the 17th century, there is record of gold being found in the area of São Vicente in the end of the 16th century. In the century or so between these initial sightings of gold and the first findings of major gold deposits, not much revenue was made, but two important modes of interacting with gold in Brazil came into place. Firstly, in the initial goldfields and smelting houses run by the Portuguese monarchy, the crown forced indigenous people into slave labor. Hundreds of thousands of people were shipped from Africa to be enslaved to work in mines by the end of the 17th century, but this process began with a couple hundred indigenous people enslaved into the gold industry at the first ventures for gold by the Crown in Brazil a century earlier. Secondly, people referred to as faiscadores or garimpeiros illegally prospected and mined for gold, dodging Portuguese taxes on precious metals. Prospectors illegally mining gold separate from the Portuguese crown was a problem for the monarchy for over a hundred years after the beginning of gold mining in Brazil.

== The gold cycle (18th century) ==
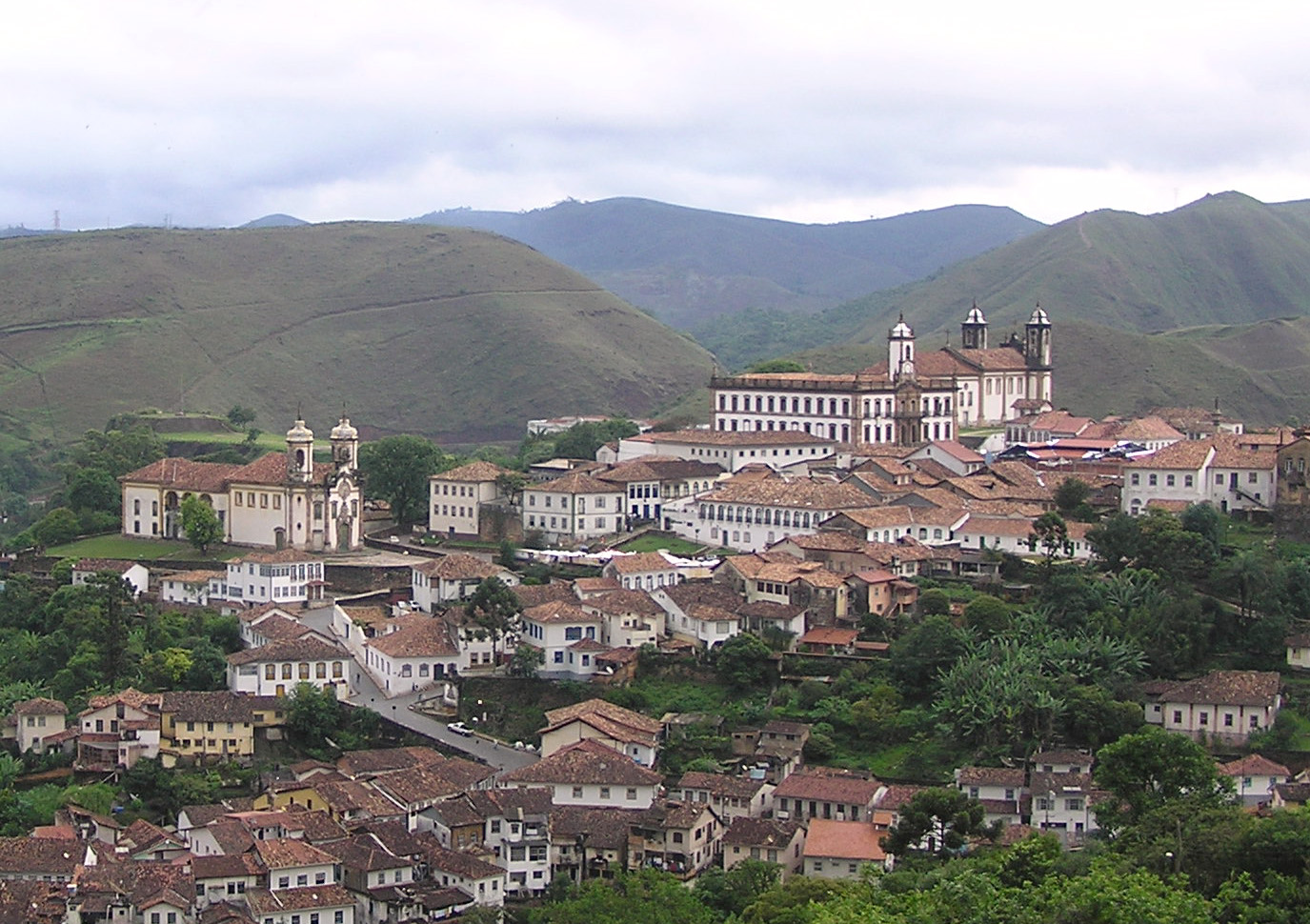
View of Ouro Preto, one of the main Portuguese settlements founded during the gold rush in Minas Gerais. The town has preserved its colonial appearance to this day

The discovery of gold was met with great enthusiasm by Portugal, which had an economy in disarray following years of wars against Spain and the Netherlands. A gold rush quickly ensued, with people from other parts of the colony and Portugal flooding the region in the first half of the 18th century. The large portion of the Brazilian inland where gold was extracted became known as Minas Gerais (General Mines). Gold mining in this area became the main economic activity of colonial Brazil during the 18th century. In Portugal, the gold was mainly used to pay for industrialized goods such as textiles and weapons from other European nations (since Portugal lacked an industrial economy) to, especially during the reign of king John V, construct Baroque buildings such as the Convent of Mafra. Apart from gold, diamond deposits were also found in 1729 around the village of Tijuco, now Diamantina. A famous figure in Brazilian history of this era was Xica da Silva, a slave woman who had a long-term relationship in Diamantina with a Portuguese official; the couple had thirteen children and she died a rich woman.

In the hilly landscape of Minas Gerais, gold was present in alluvial deposits around streams and was extracted using pans and other similar instruments that required little technology. Gold extraction was mostly done by slaves. The gold industry brought hundreds of thousands of Africans to Brazil as slaves. The Portuguese Crown allowed particulars to extract the gold, requiring a fifth (20%) of the gold (the quinto) to be sent to the colonial government as tax. To prevent smuggling and extract the quinto, the government ordered all gold to be cast into bars in the Casas de Fundição (Casting Houses) in 1725, and sent armies to the region to prevent disturbances and oversee the mining process. The Royal tax was very unpopular in Minas Gerais, and gold was frequently hidden from colonial authorities. Eventually, the quinto contributed to rebellious movements like the Vila Rica revolt, in 1720, and the Minas Gerais conspiracy, in 1789.

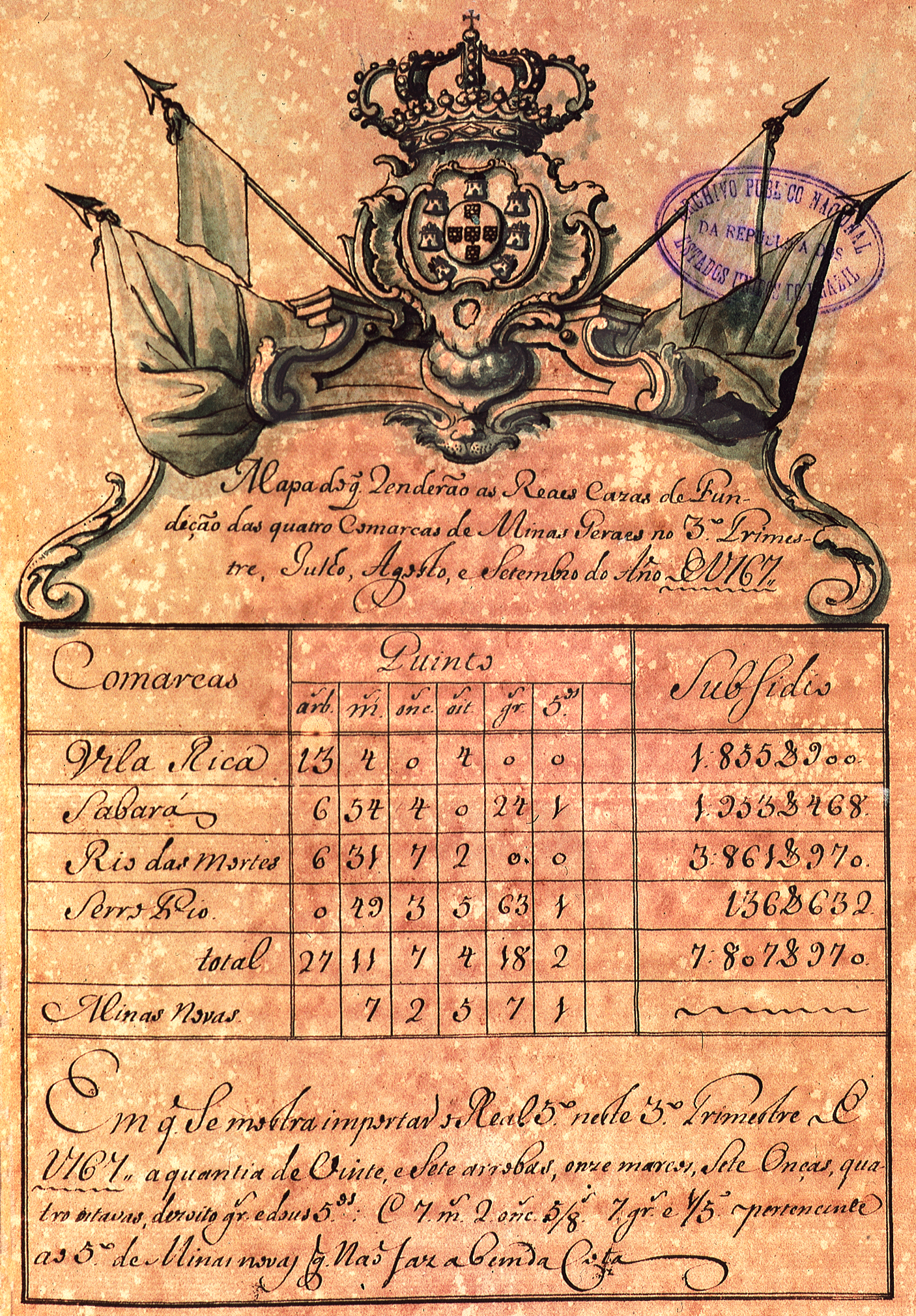
Map of gold yield in the Real Casting Houses in Minas Gerais, between July and September 1767, National Archives of Brazil

Several historians have noted that the trade deficit of Portugal in relation to the British while the Methuen Treaty was in force served to redirect much of the gold mined in Brazil during the 18th century to Britain. The Methuen Treaty was a trade treaty signed between the British and Portuguese, by which all woolen cloth imported from Britain would be tax-free in Portugal, whereas Portuguese wine exported to Britain would be taxed at one-third of the previous import tax on wines. Port wine had become increasingly popular in Britain at that time, but cloth amounted to a larger share of the trade value than wines, hence Portugal eventually incurred a trade deficit with the British.

The large number of adventurers coming to Minas Gerais led to the foundation of several settlements, the first of which was created in 1711: Vila Rica de Ouro Preto, Sabará and Mariana, followed by São João del-Rei (1713), Serro, Caeté (1714), Pitangui (1715) and São José do Rio das Mortes (1717, now Tiradentes). In contrast to other regions of colonial Brazil, people coming to Minas Gerais settled mostly in villages instead of the countryside.

In 1763, the capital of colonial Brazil was transferred from Salvador to Rio de Janeiro, which was located closer to the mining region and provided a harbor to ship the gold to Europe.

According to historian Maria Marcílio, "In 1700 Portugal had a population of about two million people. During the eighteenth century, approximately 400,000 left for [the Portuguese colony of] Brazil, despite efforts by the crown to place severe restrictions on emigration."

Gold production declined towards the end of the 18th century, beginning a period of relative stagnation of the Brazilian hinterland.

=== Colonization of the South ===
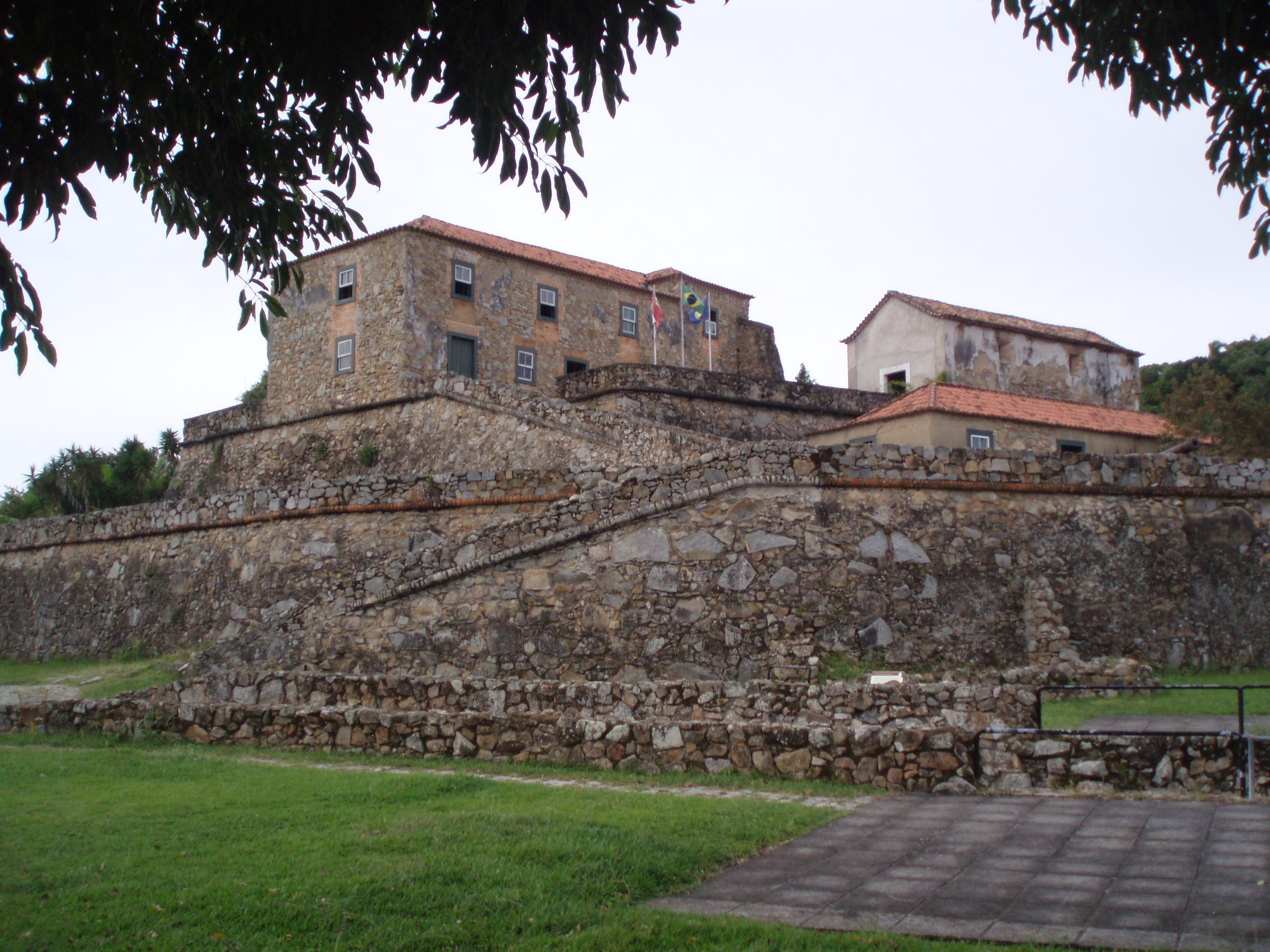
18th century-São José Fortress near Florianópolis, southern Brazil

In an attempt to expand the borders of colonial Brazil and profit from the silver mines of Potosí, the Portuguese Overseas Council (the Conselho Ultramarino) ordered colonial governor Manuel Lobo to establish a settlement on the shore of the River Plate, in a region that legally belonged to Spain. In 1679, Manuel Lobo founded Colónia do Sacramento on the margin opposite to Buenos Aires. The fortified settlement quickly became an important point of illegal commerce between the Spanish and Portuguese colonies. Spain and Portugal fought over the enclave on several occasions (1681, 1704, 1735).

In addition to Colónia do Sacramento, several settlements were established in Southern Brazil in the late 17th and 18th century, some with peasants from the Azores Islands. The towns founded in this period include Curitiba (1668), Florianópolis (1675), Rio Grande (1736), Porto Alegre (1742) and others, and helped keep southern Brazil firmly under Portuguese control.

The conflicts over the Southern colonial frontiers led to the signing of the Treaty of Madrid (1750), in which Spain and Portugal agreed to a considerable Southwestward expansion of colonial Brazil. According to the treaty, Colónia do Sacramento was to be given to Spain in exchange for the territories of São Miguel das Missões, a region occupied by Jesuit missions dedicated to evangelizing the Guaraní natives. Resistance by the Jesuits and the Guaraní led to the Guaraní War (1756), in which Portuguese and Spanish troops destroyed the missions. Colónia do Sacramento kept changing hands until 1777, when it was definitively conquered by the colonial governor of Buenos Aires.

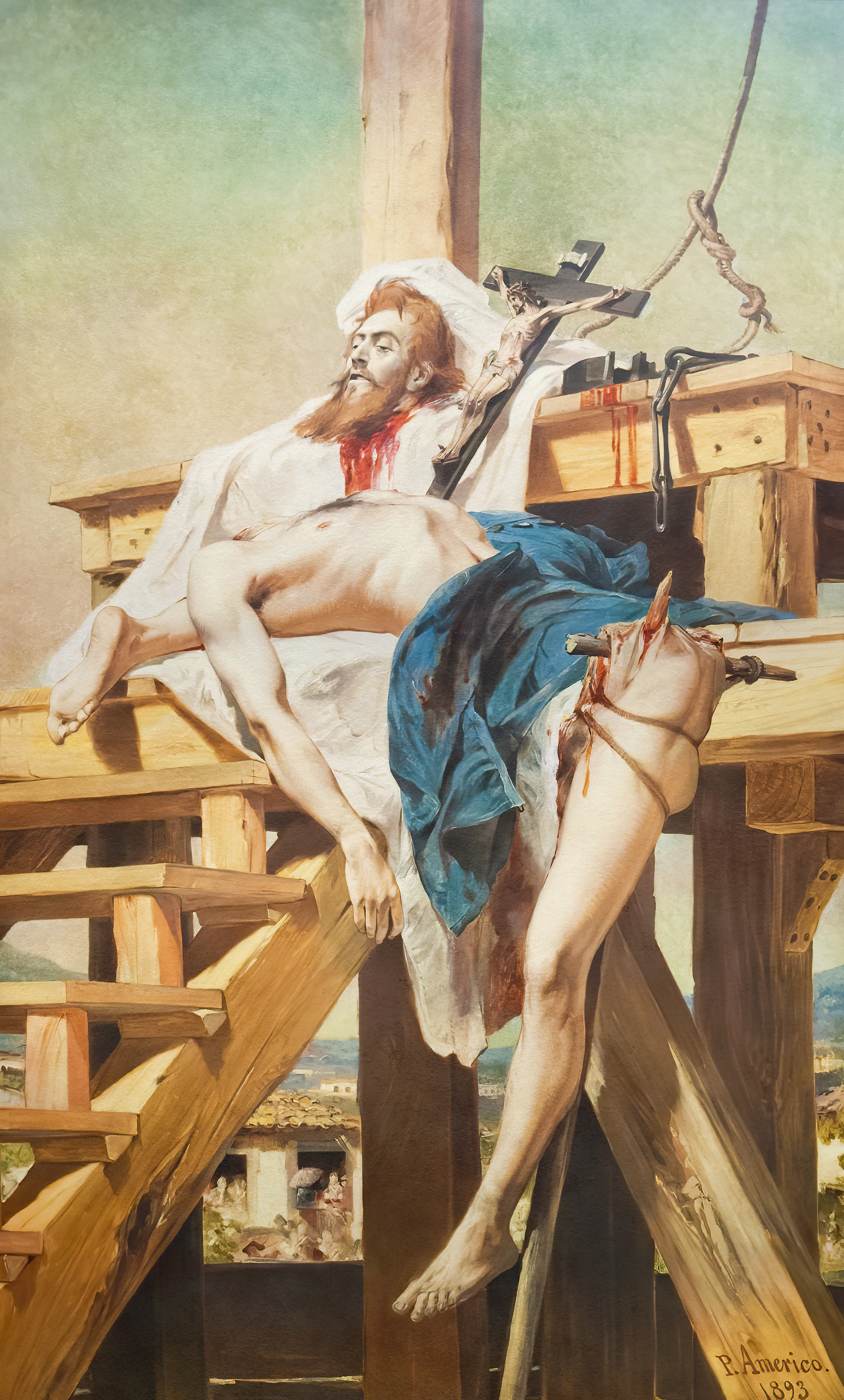
Quartered body of Tiradentes, by Brazilian painter Pedro Américo (1893)

=== Inconfidência Mineira ===
In 1788/89, Minas Gerais was the setting of the most important conspiracy against colonial authorities, the so-called Inconfidência Mineira, inspired by the ideals of the French liberal philosophers of the Age of Enlightenment and the successful American Revolution of 1776. The conspirators largely belonged to the white upper class of Minas Gerais. Many had studied in Europe, especially in the University of Coimbra, and some had large debts with the colonial government. In the context of declining gold production, the intention of the Portuguese government to impose the obligatory payment of all debts (the derrama) was a leading cause behind the conspiracy. The conspirators wanted to create a republic in which the leader would be chosen through democratic elections. The capital would be São João del-Rei, and Ouro Preto would become a university town. The structure of the society, including the right to property and the ownership of slaves, would be kept intact.

The conspiracy was discovered by the Portuguese colonial government in 1789, before the planned military rebellion could take place. Eleven of the conspirators were exiled to Portuguese colonial possessions in Angola, but Joaquim José da Silva Xavier, nicknamed Tiradentes, was sentenced to death. Tiradentes was hanged in Rio de Janeiro in 1792, drawn and quartered, and his body parts displayed in several towns. He later became a symbol of the struggle for Brazilian independence and liberty from Portuguese rule.

The Inconfidência Mineira was not the only rebellious movement in colonial Brazil against the Portuguese. Later, in 1798, there was the Inconfidência Baiana in Salvador. In this episode, which had more participation of common people, four people were hanged, and 41 were jailed. Members included slaves, middle-class people and even some landowners.

== Colonial transformation of the Brazilian environment ==
Colonial practices destroyed much of the Brazilian forest. This was made possible in part by colonial view of the natural world as a disposable collection of utilities with no inherent value.

Mining practices significantly harmed the land. To facilitate the extraction of gold, large swaths of forest along hillsides were burned in some regions. 4,000 square kilometers of the Atlantic Forest region were denuded for mining, leaving the terrain "bald and deserted". This massive destruction of the natural environment was a consequence of the colonial culture of extraction and unsustainability.

As the gold rush subsided, many Portuguese colonists abandoned mining for farming and animal husbandry. Farming practices extended inland expansion farther into the Brazilian forest. The colonists began to set in motion what became a nearly unstoppable trend with profound cumulative effects. The Portuguese colonists' decisions to pursue the economic strategy of agriculture and to adopt particular agricultural practices significantly transformed the Brazilian environment. The Portuguese colonists viewed farming as a beneficial taming of the frontier, urging mestizos, mulattoes, and indigenous peoples to abandon life in the wild forest and adopt agriculture. Colonial farming practices in the forest were unsustainable, greatly exploiting the land. Slash-and-burn practices were used liberally, and colonial responses to the presence of the ant genus Atta encouraged both large-scale abandonment of fields and extensive clearing of additional lands. Atta effectively resisted agriculture. In only a few years, the ants constructed elaborate and complex colonies that colonists found nearly impossible to destroy and that made hoeing and plowing extremely difficult. Instead of fighting the ants, colonists ceded their fields to the ants, created new fields through burning, then a few years later ceded their new fields to the ants.

This environmental transformation contrasted sharply with Brazilian Amerindian land-management concepts and practices. Unlike in many areas of Central and South America, in Brazil Amerindians did not significantly disrupt and damage biotic communities. Amerindians maintained very small communities, and their total numbers were small. In addition, they prioritized the long-term agricultural productivity of the land, utilizing cultivation, hunting, and gathering practices that were sustainable.

The introduction of European livestock—cattle, horses, and pigs—also radically transformed the land. Indigenous flora in the interior of Brazil withered and died in the face of repeated trampling by cattle; the flora were replaced by grasses able to adapt to such abuse. Cattle also overgrazed fertile fields, killing vegetation that was able to survive extensive trampling. Scrubby noxious plants, some of which were poisonous, replaced this vegetation. Colonists responded to these unwanted plants by burning innumerable large pastures, a practice that killed countless small animals and greatly damaged soil nutrients.

=== Challenges to the sustainability and the growth of agriculture ===
The mining of gold and diamonds shaped the internal economy of agriculture. Although slash-and-burn agriculture was able to feed the mining region throughout the 1700s, deforestation and the degradation of the land made farming increasingly difficult in the long term and forced farmers to look for grasses further away from these mining centers. As a result, by 1800, foodstuffs were carried on mule trains by tropeiros as far as 100 kilometers just to reach Ouro Preto. Although the colonial authorities encouraged the mining industry, like the Jesuits before them, they also noticed the negative effects of slash-and-burn agriculture.

In 1765, Luís António de Sousa Botelho became the governor of the captaincy of São Paulo. He attempted to stop slash-and-burn agriculture through the imposition of a village social order. Botelho encouraged mestizos, mulattos, assimilated indigenous people, and Paulista farmers to take up the plow and use the manure of draft animals as fertilizer, but his reforms did not work for several reasons. Botelho's propositions did not appeal to farmers because farmers would have to work more hours without any guarantee or probability of actually increasing their harvest. The colonial land policy favored the elite, who could afford purchasing expensive land titles. Because these small-scale farmers were unable to attain land titles to make their fields their property, they were uninvested in sustainable farming practices. Botelho also saw slavery as a hindrance to the agricultural development of the region. Although his reforms were unsuccessful and he was not able to implement all of his ideas, Botelho did recognize that mercantilism and militarism impeded the growth of agriculture.

Other impediments to the growth of agriculture, included the criminalization and vilification of the poor. Heavy taxes were expected in cash from poor farmers. While reimbursements could be delayed for years, when taxes were not paid, the family's young men were forced into military service. One governor in Minas Gerais noted with dismay that white settlers seemed to reject all forms of intensive manual labor in the hopes of increasing their chances at upward social mobility. Botelho, himself, "conscripted almost 5,000 men from an adult population that could not have numbered more than 35,000." Unemployed men were designated as vadios or vagabundos and enlisted in the military or sent to the frontier along convicts. Some of the men managed to escape the authorities and found refuge in the Atlantic forest, where they became subsistence farmers or prospectors; these men would later come to form part of the "caboclo frontier."

The pests and plagues that invaded farmers' crops were a significant barrier to the growth of agriculture. Rodents, insects, and birds ate many crops, but the most pervasive pests were the leaf-cutting ants, or saúva (in Tupi). These ants are difficult to eliminate as, even today, they are difficult to study because they work at night and live below the ground. Farmers at that time, were unsure on how to deal with saúva, and unfortunately, resorted to countermeasures, like slash-and-burn, that only exacerbated the problem.

==== Cattle raising ====
As with agriculture, the mining economy shaped the cattle raising industry from its outset. Beef was eaten by miners and was "the preferred source of protein in the neo-European diet" of Colonial Brazil. Cattle raising spread from São Paulo to the Guarapuava plains.

Cattle were not particularly cared for. No fodder was provided, and even castrating and branding were often neglected. As a result, there was a severe mortality rate during the dry season, and it took several years for cattle to reach a sellable weight. Salt served as a poor dietary supplement for cattle, and this inadequate use, simply made salt-preserved meats and dairy products "unnecessarily expensive." Cattle suffered from intestinal parasites and ticks. In their attempts to escape pests and threats, they often moved into forest margins, disrupting their ecosystems. As mentioned, cattle raising changed the native landscape from palatable grasses to "scrubby, noxious" plants, but trying to eliminate them by burning only worked temporarily. In the long term, burning these grasses caused erosion, reduced soil permeability, and produced degraded, innutritious pasture prone to becoming hosting ticks and poisonous plant species. Cattle took longer to reach their weight, and by choosing the largest animals, herders only worsened the breed through "negative selective pressure." Although they were edible and fire-resistant, the African grasses that eventually replaced native ones were not as nutritious because they were not planted in variety to provide a more balanced diet.

Because of degraded grasslands, high mortality rate, slow growth, and low population, like agriculture, the cattle raising industry in Colonial Brazil was not very productive. In fact, hunter-gatherers in this area could have attained more meat than the cattle breeders, who annually produced a maximum of "five kilograms of meat per hectare." Thus, wasteful agricultural practices and irresponsible cattle raising methods not only led to the degradation of the native landscape; they also did little for the long-term economic development of the region. Historian Warren Dean acknowledges the effects that colonialism and capitalism had on the seemingly "useless" and "wasteful" exploitation of the Atlantic Forest, yet he also warns the reader against ascribing the whole blame on colonialism and capitalism. According to Dean, there is evidence to suggest colonists accepted "regal authority" only when it supported their interests and that "colonies were not necessarily condemned to [lower] levels of capital formation." "Resistance to the demands of imperialism," says Dean, can have as "forceful and determinant [of an effect on] the formation of states and nations as imperialism itself."

== The Royal Court in Brazil (1808–1821) ==
The Spanish and Portuguese empires in 1790

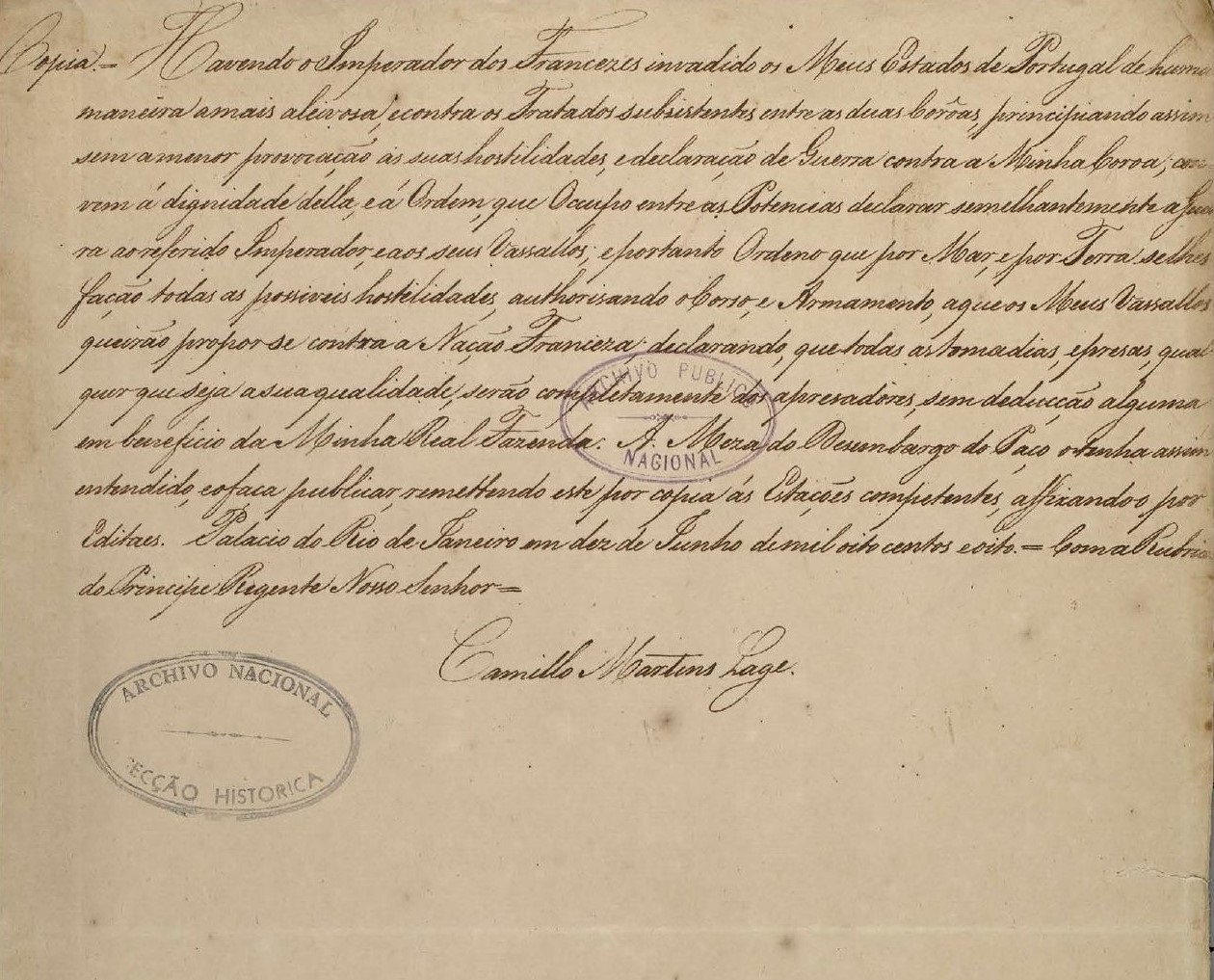
Declaration of war made by Prince Regent John to Napoleon Bonaparte and all his vassals, 1808

The Napoleonic invasion of the Iberian peninsula set off major changes there and in both Portugal's and Spain's overseas empires. In 1807 French troops of Napoleon Bonaparte invaded Britain's ally, Portugal. Prince Regent John (future king John VI), who had governed since 1792 on behalf of his mother, queen Maria I, ordered the transfer of the Portuguese royal court to Brazil before he could be deposed by the invading army. In January 1808, prince John and his court arrived in Salvador, where he signed a commercial regulation that opened commerce between Brazil and friendly nations (Britain). This important law broke the colonial pact that, until then, allowed Brazil to maintain direct commercial relations with Portugal only.

In March 1808, the court arrived in Rio de Janeiro. In 1815, during the Congress of Vienna, Prince John created the United Kingdom of Portugal, Brazil and the Algarves by elevating Brazil to the rank of kingdom and increasing its administrative autonomy.

In 1816, with the death of queen Maria, prince John succeeded as monarch, and the ceremony of his acclamation was held in Rio de Janeiro in February 1818.

Among the important measures taken by prince John in his years in Brazil were incentives to commerce and industry, the permission to print newspapers and books, the creation of two medicine schools, military academies, and the first bank of Brazil. In Rio de Janeiro he also created a powder factory, a Botanical Garden, an art academy (Escola Nacional de Belas Artes) and an opera house (Teatro São João). All these measures greatly advanced the independence of Brazil in relation to Portugal and made the later political separation between the two countries inevitable.

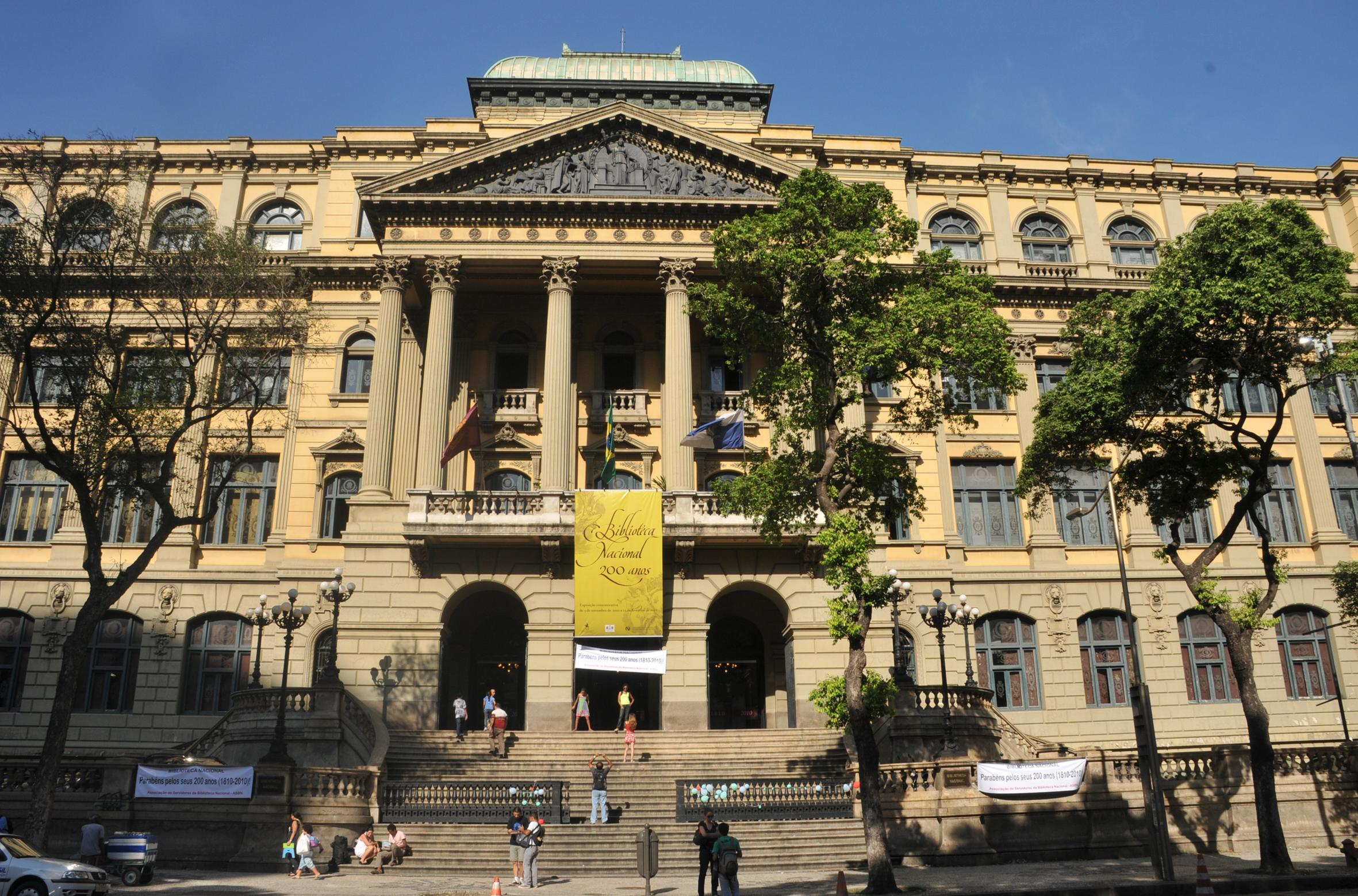
National Library of Brazil, established by Dom João VI in the 19th century, has one of the richest literary collections in the world.

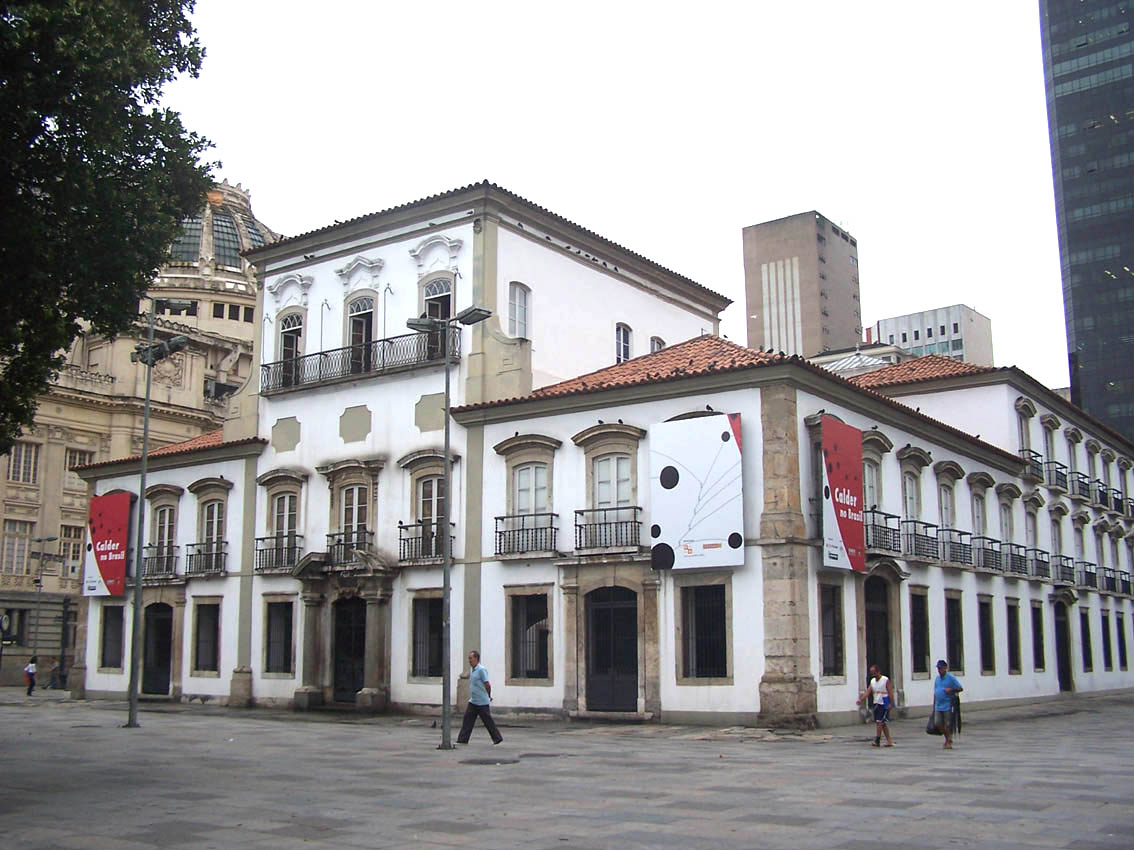
The Paço Imperial, an 18th-century colonial palace located in Rio de Janeiro, used as a dispatch house by King João VI of Portugal and later by his son, Emperor Pedro I of Brazil.

Due to the absence of the king and the economic independence of Brazil, Portugal entered a severe crisis that obliged John VI and the royal family to return to Portugal in 1821: a Liberal Revolution had broken out in Portugal in 1820, and the royal governors who ruled Portugal in the king's name had been replaced by a revolutionary Council of Regency formed to govern the European portion of the united kingdom until the king's return. Indeed, the king's immediate return to Lisbon was one of the main demands of the revolutionaries. Under the revolutionary Council of Regency, a constituent assembly, known as the Portuguese Constitutional Courts (Cortes Constitucionais Portuguesas), was elected to abolish the absolute monarchy and replace it with a constitutional one. King John VI, then, yielding to pressure, returned to Europe. Brazilian representatives were elected to join the deliberations of the Constitutional Cortes of the kingdom.

The heir of John VI, prince Pedro, remained in Brazil. The Portuguese Cortes demanded that Brazil return to its former condition of colony and that the heir return to Portugal. Prince Pedro, influenced by the Rio de Janeiro Municipal Senate (Senado da Câmara), refused to return to Portugal in the famous Dia do Fico (January 9, 1822). Political independence came on 7 September 1822, and the prince was crowned emperor in Rio de Janeiro as Dom Pedro I, ending 322 years of dominance of Portugal over Brazil.

== Territorial evolution of colonial Brazil ==
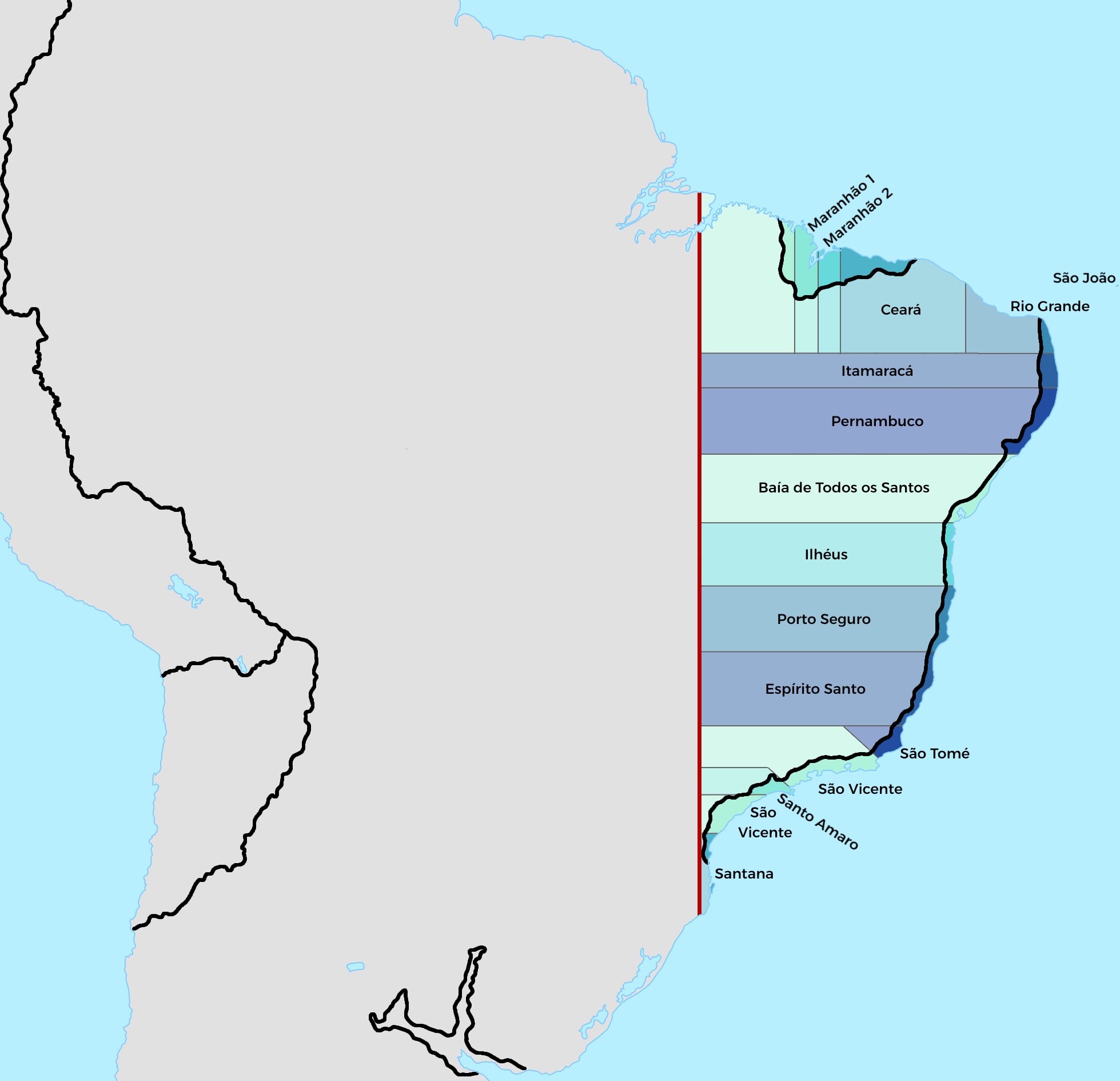
1534
Capitanias hereditárias

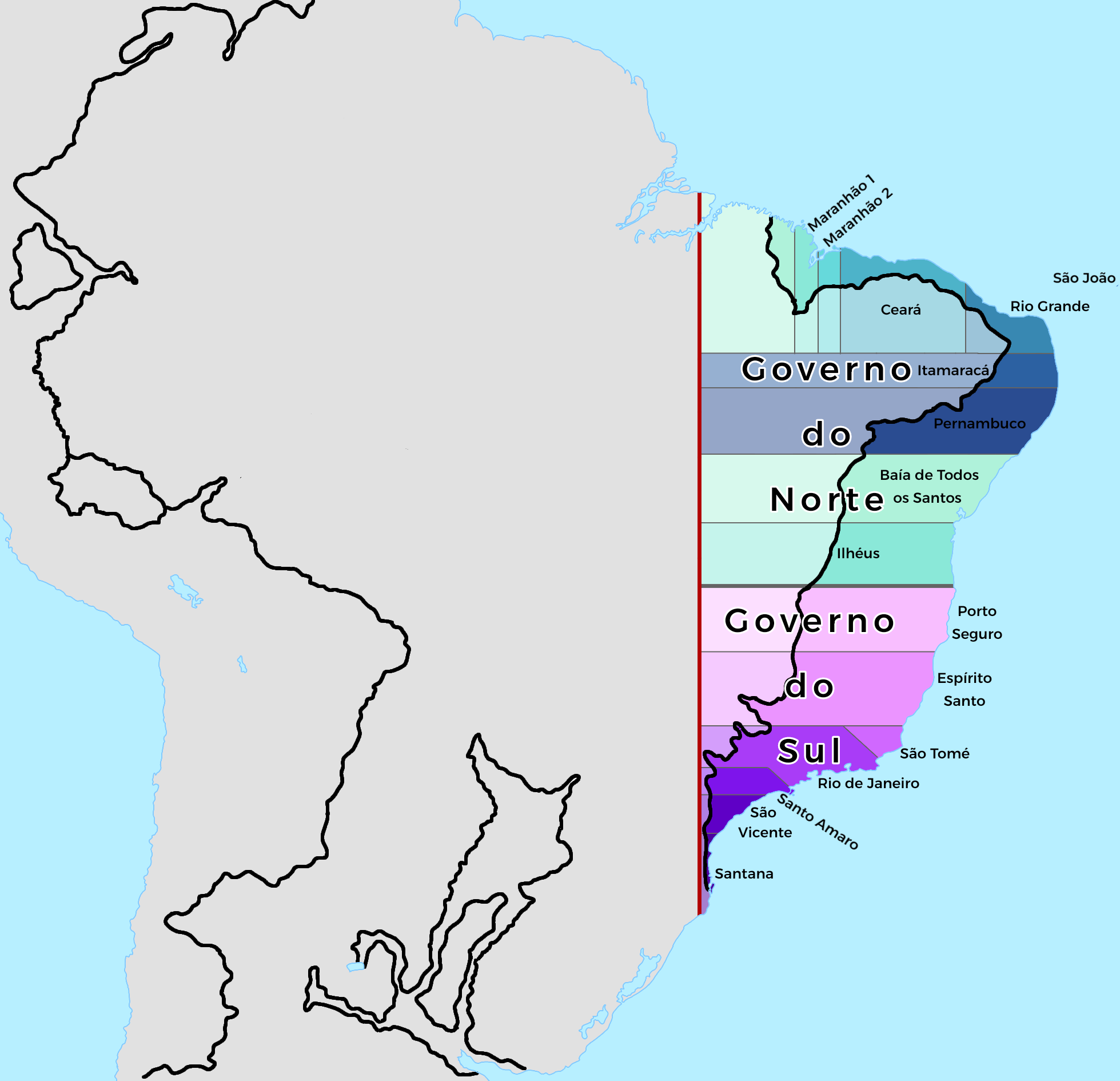
1574
Two states

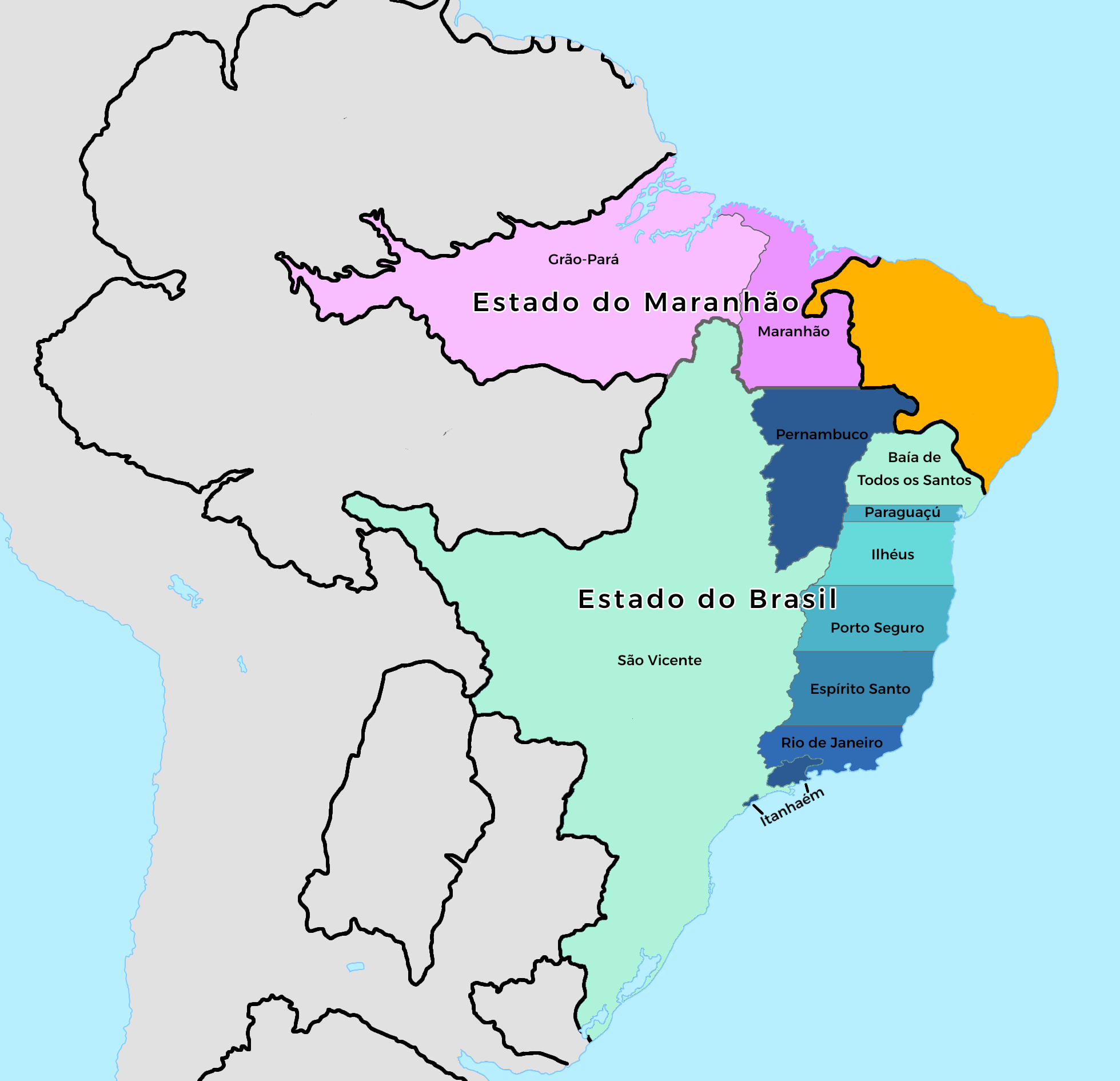
1647
Dutch invasion

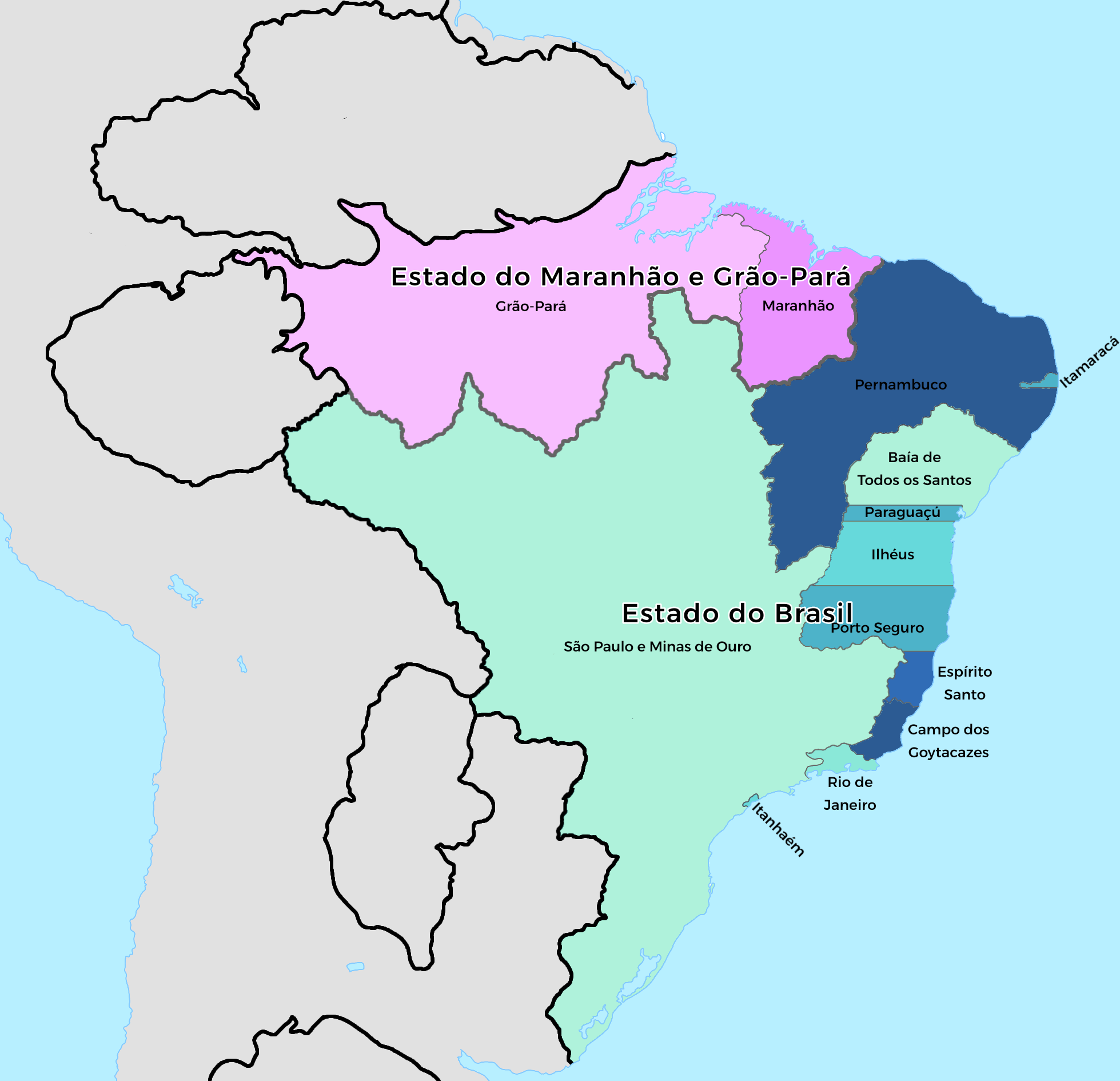
1709
Inland expansion

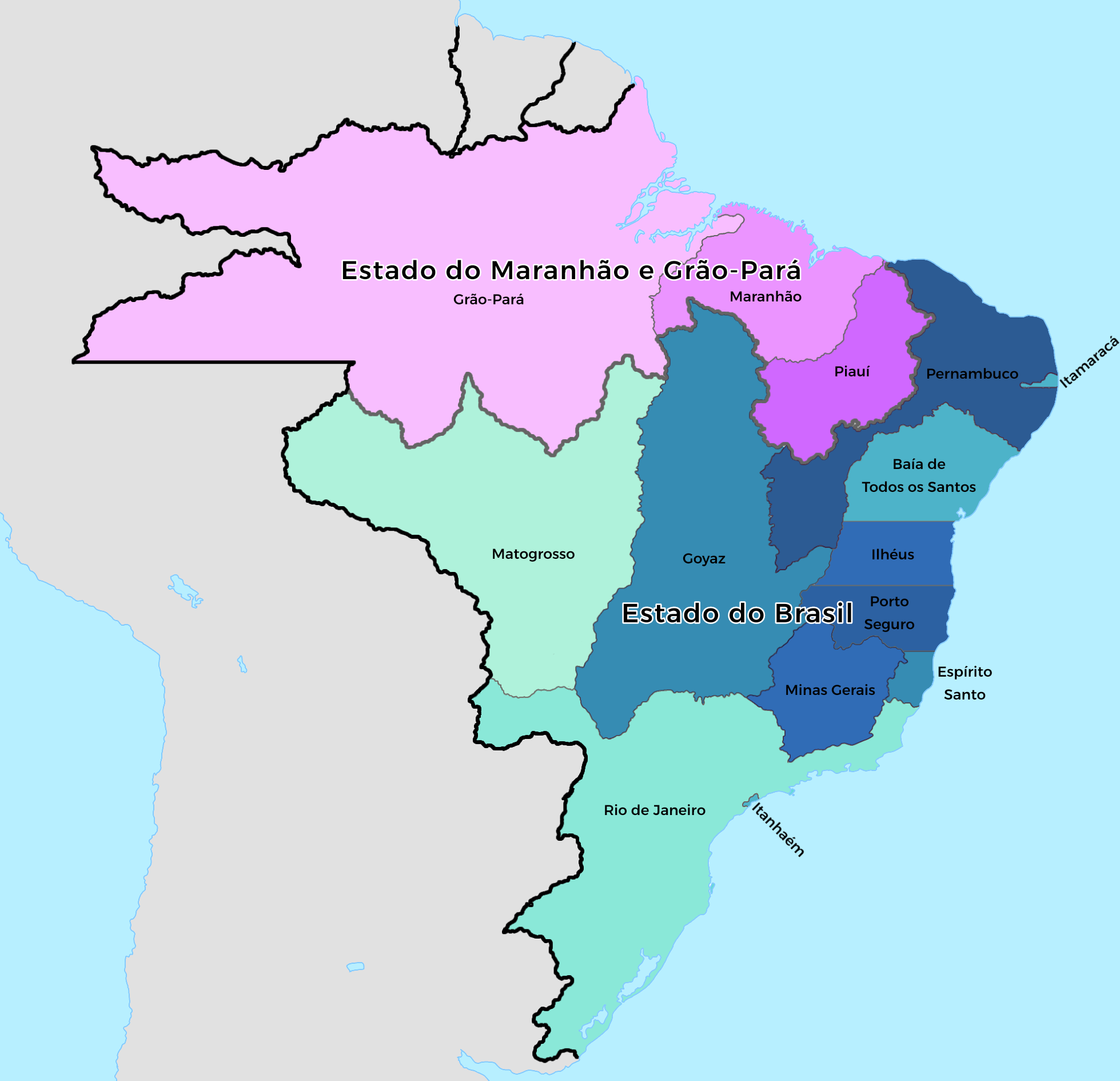
1750
Treaty of Madrid

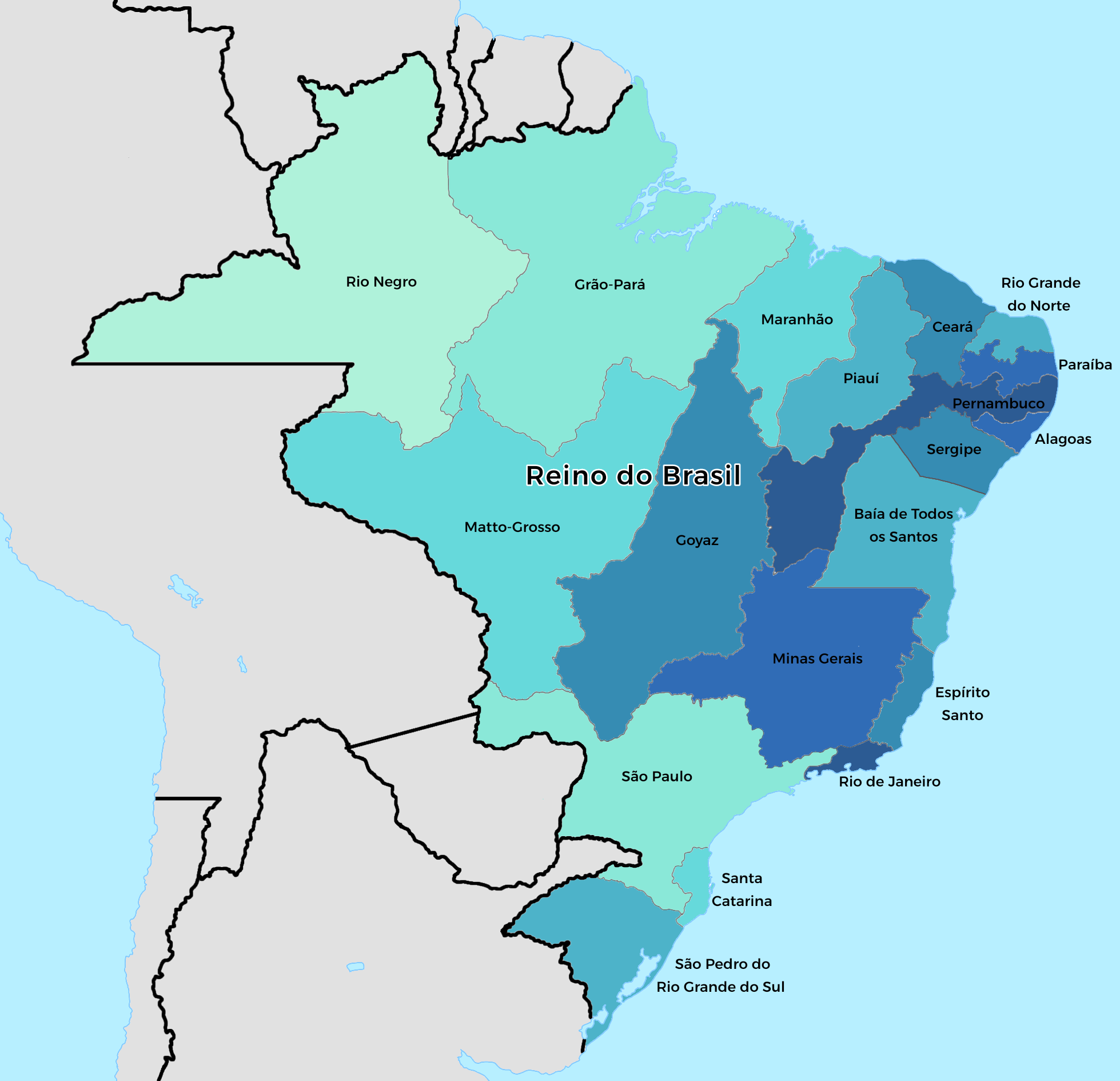
1817
At the time of the Pernambucan revolt

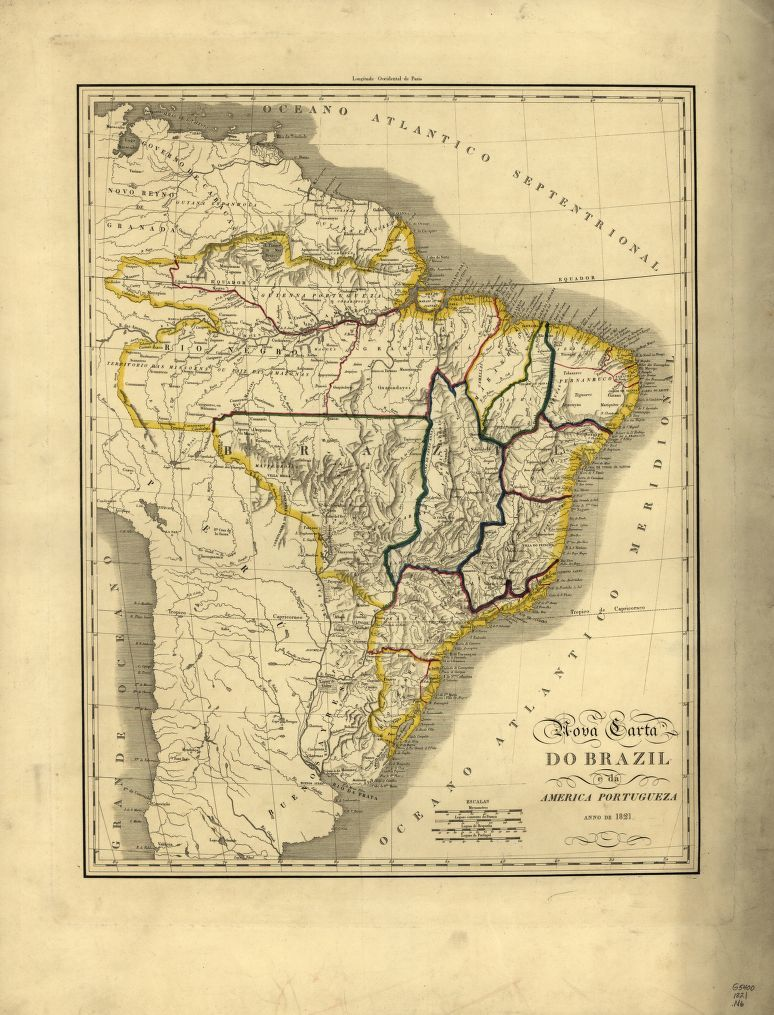
Dimension of Brazil (date: 1821) with Kingdom of Portugal Brazil and Algarves (Preserved map in National Library of Portugal)

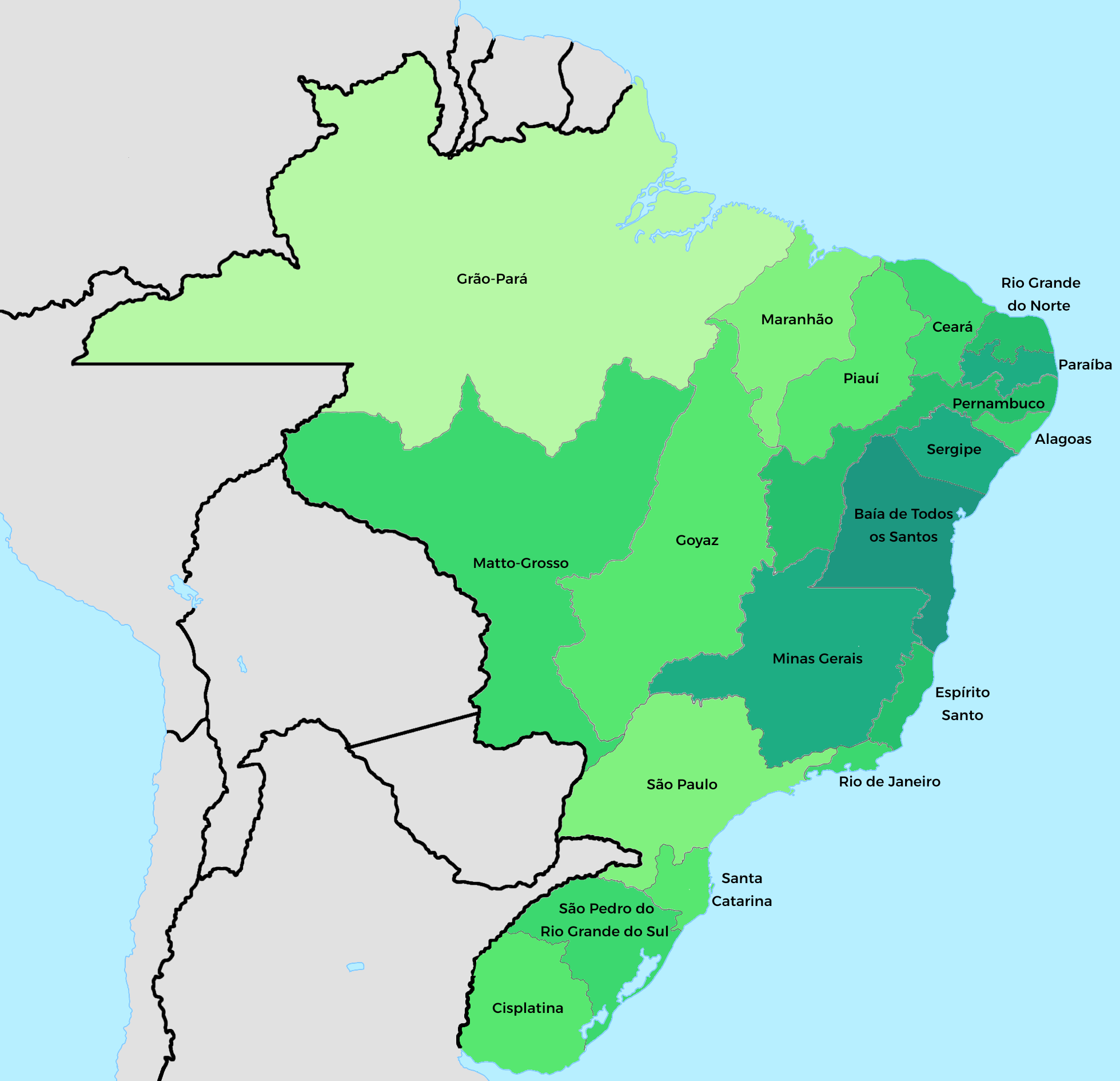
1822
At date of independence

== Administrative evolution ==
=== Timeline ===
Colonial entities, ordered by the date of establishment, earlier to later:

- Captaincy Colonies of Brazil (Private and autonomous colonies 1534–1549)
- Captaincies of Brazil (Colonial provincial districts from 1549 to 1815)
- Governorate General of Brazil (1549–1572 / 1578–1607 / 1613–1621)
  - Governorate General of Bahia (1572–1578 / 1607–1613)
  - Governorate General of Rio de Janeiro (1572–1578 / 1607–1613)
- State of Brazil (1621–1815)
- State of Maranhão (1621–1751)
- State of Grão-Pará and Maranhão (1751–1772)
- State of Grão-Pará and Rio Negro (1772–1775)
- State of Maranhão and Piauí (1772–1775)
- In 1808 the queen and the Prince Regent of Portugal arrive in Brazil and the Prince Regent's Government assumes direct control of the administration of the State of Brazil;
- In 1815, the State of Brazil is elevated to the rank of a kingdom (the Kingdom of Brazil) and with the simultaneous formation of the United Kingdom of Portugal, Brazil and the Algarves, marking the formal end of the colonial era.
- In 1822, Brazil secedes from the United Kingdom and the independent Empire of Brazil is founded. The separation is recognized by Portugal in 1825 after the Treaty of Rio de Janeiro.

=== Details ===
The detailed history of the administrative changes in the administration of colonial Brazil is as follows:

From 1534 (immediately after the start the Portuguese attempts to effectively colonize Brazil) until 1549, Brazil was divided by the Portuguese Crown in private and autonomous colonies known as hereditary captaincies (capitanias hereditárias), or captaincy colonies (colónias capitanias).

In 1549, Portuguese King John III abolished the system of private colonies, and the fifteen existing hereditary captaincies were incorporated into a single Crown colony, the Governorate General of Brazil.

The individual captaincies, now under the administration of the Portuguese Crown (and no longer called colonies or hereditary captaincies, but simply captaincies of Brazil), continued to exist as provinces or districts within the colony until the end of the colonial era in 1815.

The unified Governorate General of Brazil, with its capital city in Salvador, existed during three periods: from 1549 to 1572, from 1578 to 1607 and from 1613 to 1621. Between 1572 and 1578 and again between 1607 and 1613, the colony was split in two, and during those periods the Governorate General of Brazil did not exist, being replaced by two separate Governorates: the Governorate General of Bahia, in the North, with its seat in the city of Salvador, and the Governorate General of Rio de Janeiro, in the South, with its seat in the city of Rio de Janeiro.

In 1621, an administrative reorganization took place, and the Governorate General of Brazil became known as the State of Brazil (Estado do Brasil), keeping Salvador as its capital city. With this administrative remodeling, the unity of the colony was once again interrupted, as a portion of territory in the northern part of modern Brazil became an autonomous colony, separate from the State of Brazil: the State of Maranhão, with its capital city in São Luiz.

In 1652, the State of Maranhão was extinguished, and its territory was briefly added to the State of Brazil, reunifying the colonial administration once more.

However, in 1654, the territories of the former State of Maranhão were again separated from the State of Brazil, and the Captaincy of Grão-Pará was also split from Brazil. In this restructuring, the territories of Grão-Pará and Maranhão, severed from Brazil, were united in a single State, initially named as State of Maranhão and Grão-Pará, having São Luiz as its capital city. This newly created State incorporated territories recently acquired by the Portuguese west of the Tordesillas line.

In 1751, the State of Maranhão and Grão-Pará was renamed as the State of Grão-Pará and Maranhão, and its capital city as transferred from São Luiz (in Maranhão) to Belém (in the part of the State that was then known as Grão-Pará).

In 1763, the capital city of the State of Brazil was transferred from Salvador to Rio de Janeiro. At the same time, the title of the King's representative heading the government of the State of Brazil was officially changed from Governor General to Viceroy (Governors coming from the high nobility had been using the title of Viceroy since about 1640). However, the name of Brazil was never changed to Viceroyalty of Brazil. That title, although sometimes used by modern writers, is not proper, as the colony continued to be titled State of Brazil.

In 1772, in a short-lived territorial reorganization, the State of Grão-Pará and Maranhão was split in two: the State of Grão-Pará and Rio Negro (better known simply as the State of Grão-Pará), with the city of Belém as its capital, and the State of Maranhão and Piauí (better known simply as the State of Maranhão), with its seat in the city of São Luiz.

Thus from 1772 until another territorial reorganization in 1775 there were three distinct Portuguese States in South America: the State of Brazil, the State of Grão-Pará and Rio Negro, and the State of Maranhão and Piauí.

In 1775, in a final territorial reorganization, the colony was once again reunified: the State of Maranhão and Piauí and the State of Grão-Pará and Rio Negro were both abolished, and their territories were incorporated into the territory of the State of Brazil. The State of Brazil was thus expanded; it became the sole Portuguese State in South America; and it now included in its territory the whole of the Portuguese possessions in the American Continent. Indeed, with the reorganization of 1775, for the first time since 1654, all the Portuguese territories in the New World were once again united under a single colonial government. Rio de Janeiro, that had become the capital of the State of Brazil in 1763, continued to be the capital, now of the unified colony.

In 1808, the Portuguese Court was transferred to Brazil as direct consequence of the invasion of Portugal during the Napoleonic Wars. The office of Viceroy of Brazil ceased to exist upon the arrival of the royal family in Rio de Janeiro, since the Prince Regent, the future King John VI, assumed personal control of the government of the colony, that became the provisional seat of the whole Portuguese Empire.

In 1815, Brazil ceased to be a colony, upon the elevation of the State of Brazil to the rank of a kingdom, the Kingdom of Brazil, and the simultaneous political union of that kingdom with the Kingdoms of Portugal and the Algarves, forming a single sovereign State, the United Kingdom of Portugal, Brazil and the Algarves. That political union would last until 1822 when Brazil declared its independence from the United Kingdom of Portugal, Brazil and the Algarves and became the Empire of Brazil, a sovereign nation in the territory of the former Kingdom of Brazil. The separation was recognized by Portugal with the signing of the 1825 Treaty of Rio de Janeiro.

With the creation of the Kingdom of Brazil in 1815, the former captaincies of the State of Brazil became provinces within the new Kingdom, and after independence, they became the provinces of the Empire of Brazil.

== See also ==
Colonization

- Ilha de Vera Cruz (Terra de Santa Cruz)
- Portuguese colonization of the Americas#Colonization of Brazil
- Portuguese Empire#Colonization efforts in the Americas
- Camarão indians' letters

General history

- History of Brazil
- Brazil#History
- History of Portugal
- Cartography of Latin America

== Further reading in English ==
- Alden, Dauril. Royal Government in Colonial Brazil with Special Reference to the Administration of the Marquis of Lavradio, Viceroy 1769–1779. 1968.
- Bethell, Leslie, ed. Colonial Brazil. 1987.
- Boxer, C. R. Salvador de Sá and the struggle for Brazil and Angola, 1602–1686. [London] University of London, 1952.
- Boxer, C. R. The Dutch in Brazil, 1624–1654. Oxford, Clarendon Press, 1957.
- The Golden Age of Brazil, 1695-1750: Growing Pains of a Colonial Society (Q123708177)
- Freyre, Gilberto. The Masters and the Slaves: A Study of the Development of Brazilian Civilization, translated by Samuel Putnam. revised edition 1963.
- Hemming, John. Red Gold: The Conquest of the Brazilian Indians. 1978.
- Hemming, John. Amazon Frontier: The Defeat of the Brazilian Indians. London: Macmillan 1987.
- Higgins, Kathleen. Licentious Liberty in a Brazilian Gold-Mining Region. University Park: Penn State Press 1999.
- Kuznesof, Elizabeth. Household Economy and Urban Development: São Paulo, 1765–1836. Boulder: Westview Press 1986.
- Lang, James. Portuguese Brazil: The King's Plantation. 1979.
- Metcalf, Alida C. Family and Frontier in Colonial Brazil: Santana de Parnaiba, 1480–1822. 1991.
- Nazzari, Muriel. Disappearance of the dowry: Women, Families and Social Change in São Paulo (1600–1900). 1991.
- Prado, Caio Junior. The Colonial Background of Modern Brazil. translated by suzette Macedo. 1967.
- Russell-Wood, A.J.R. Fidalgos and Philanthropists: The Santa Casa de Misericórdia of Bahia, 1550–1755. 1968.
- Russell-Wood, A.J.R. "Archives and Recent Historiography on Colonial Brazil". Latin American Research Review 36:1(2001): 75–103.
- Russell-Wood, A.J.R. "United States Scholarly Contributions to the Historiography of Colonial Brazil", Hispanic American Historical Review 65:4(1985):683–723.
- Russell-Wood, A.J.R. Society and Government in Colonial Brazil, 1500–1822. 1992.
- Russell-Wood, A.J.R. From Colony to Nation: Essays on the Independence of Brazil. 1975.
- Schultz, Kristin. Tropical Versailles: Empire, Monarchy, and the Portuguese Royal Court in Rio de Janeiro. New York: Routledge 2001.
- Schwartz, Stuart B., "The Historiography of Early Modern Brazil", in The Oxford Handbook of Latin American History, José C. Moya, ed. New York: Oxford University Press 2011, pp. 98–131.
- Schwartz, Stuart B., "Somebodies and Nobodies in the Body Politic: Mentalities and Social Structures in Colonial Brazil", Latin American Research Review 31:1(1996): 112–34.
- Schwartz, Stuart B. Sovereignty and Society in Colonial Brazil. Berkeley: University of California Press 1978.
- Schwartz, Stuart B. Sugar Plantations in the Formation of Brazilian Society. Cambridge: Cambridge University Press 1985.
- Schwartz, Stuart B. Peasants and Rebels: Reconsidering Brazilian Slavery. 1992.
- Verger, Pierre. Bahia and the West African Trade, 1549–1851. Ibadan: Ibadan University Press 1964.
- Wadsworth, James E. "In the Name of the Inquisition: The Portuguese Inquisition and Delegated Authority in Colonial Pernambuco", The Americas 61:1 (2004): 19–52.

== Bibliography ==
- Prado Junior, Caio. História econômica do Brasil.
- Furtado, Celso. Formação econômica do Brasil.
- Van Groesen, Michiel. (ed.) The Legacy of Dutch Brazil. New York: Cambridge University Press, 2014.
- "Colonial history of Brazil in the Rio de Janeiro Municipality" website (in Portuguese).
- Braudel, Fernand, The Perspective of the World, Vol. III of Civilization and Capitalism, 1984.
- "Report of the Brown University Steering Committee on Slavery and Justice"
