= Brazilian coffee cycle =

Period of Brazilian economic history

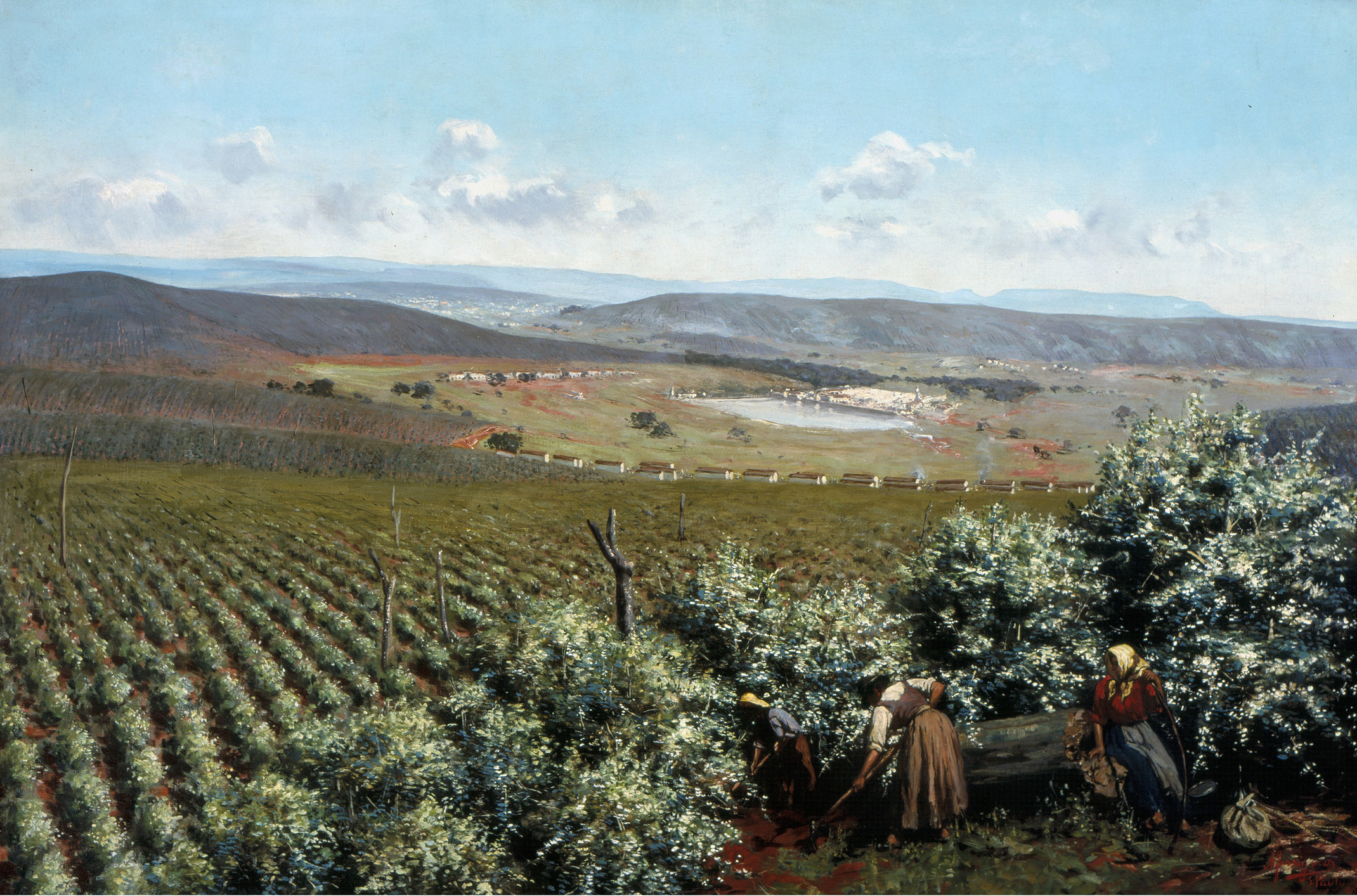
The Bloom (Portuguese: A Florada), painting by Antonio Ferrigno (1903). Ipiranga Museum collection

In Brazil's economic history, the coffee cycle (Portuguese: Ciclo do café) was a period in which coffee was the main export product of the Brazilian economy. It began in the mid-19th century and ended in 1930. The coffee cycle succeeded the gold cycle, which had come to an end after the exhaustion of the mines a few decades earlier, and put an end to the economic crisis generated by this decadence.

Coffee had been brought to Brazil in 1727, but was never produced in large scale, being cultivated mostly for domestic consumption. Its production lagged far behind that of other products. Coffee's rise was only due to a favorable internal and external scenario that made its cultivation advantageous.

Coffee production developed rapidly throughout the 19th century, so that by the 1850s it was responsible for almost half of Brazil's exports. The Southeast region of the country was chosen for the plantations because it offered the most appropriate weather conditions and the most suitable soil, according to the needs of the coffee plant. The first large cultivated region was the Paraíba Valley, and the work in the plantations was done with slave labor. With the decline of production in this region, it shifted to the west of São Paulo, where it found its second great cultivation area. At this point free labor, especially that of European immigrants (mostly Italians) who were arriving in large numbers in Brazil in the late 19th and early 20th centuries, had replaced slave labor.

The coffee cycle left deep marks in the country, and its consequences are still perceptible today. It was during the coffee cycle that the state of São Paulo achieved the political and economic primacy it has today. Coffee also gave a strong impulse to industrialization, railroad construction and urbanization.

== Background ==
=== Mining decline and economic crisis ===
In the first two centuries of the colonial period, Brazil had an exclusively agricultural economy, and there was always one major product that was the center of the economy. This was the case during the cycle of brazilwood, sugar and cotton. This scenario only changed in the 18th century with the discovery of gold and diamonds, initiating the so-called gold cycle. From then on, agriculture lost the importance it had. Although it was not an agricultural product, the same pattern was evident – gold became the main product of the colonial economy, until its decline. This occurred in the second half of the 18th century, a period that became known as the "agricultural renaissance". The same products as before were planted again, except for coffee, which in the first two centuries did not even exist in Brazil. This return to agriculture occurred mainly for the following reasons:

- The depletion of the gold deposits due to the quantity and speed at which gold was extracted;
- The rapid development of European society throughout the 18th century;
- The increase in economic activities and trade relations in the world in the same century, heralding the Industrial Revolution; and, later, the opening of Brazil's ports, which allowed it to trade with countries besides Portugal, encouraging an increase in agricultural production.

The end of the gold cycle also generated an economic crisis, during which the purchasing power of the population was much lower than during the golden age of mining. It was a long crisis, which would only end in the following century, during the regency period, with the rise of coffee, which would take the place of gold as the main product of the Brazilian economy. Coffee also solved the "independence crisis". Around the time of Independence, there was a crisis characterized by a lasting stagnation of exports.

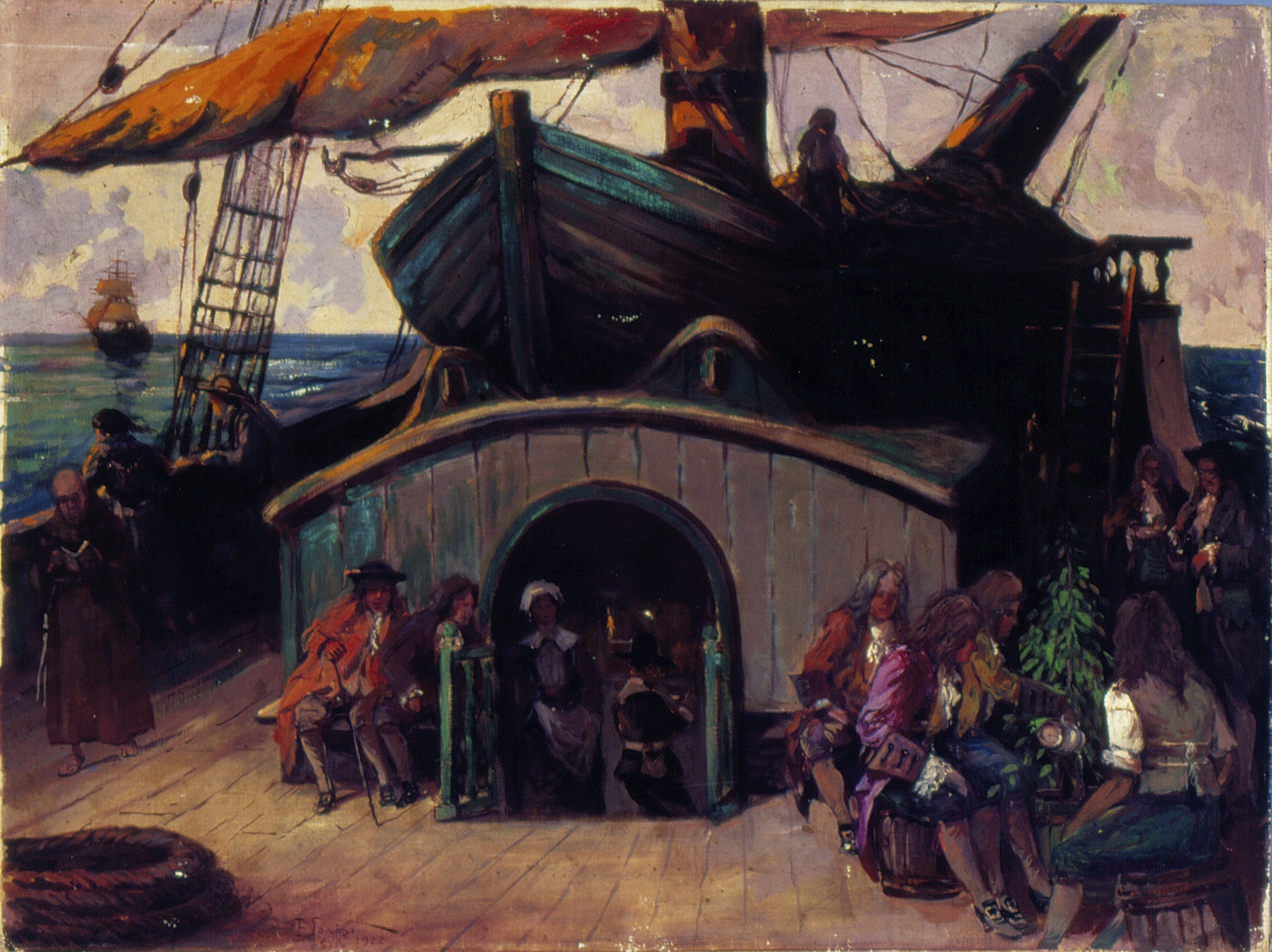
First Coffee Seedlings, 1760 (Portuguese: Primeiras Mudas de Café, 1760), painting by Alfredo Norfini, Ipiranga Museum collection

=== External scenario that propitiated the cultivation of coffee ===
Coffee had been cultivated in Brazil for some time, since it was brought to the country in 1727 by Francisco Palheta. Since then, the product had spread throughout the national territory, but it was not cultivated commercially; it was mainly for domestic consumption. The coffee culture was far behind that of sugar and cotton and, besides this, the product did not have great importance in world markets and was difficult to plant. Because the coffee tree is a delicate plant that needs a lot of care, it only lives well in certain temperatures, it needs regular rainfall and appropriate soil, besides taking four or five years to grow and produce the bean.

However, there are a few reasons why it has become advantageous to grow coffee:

- In the early years of the 19th century, coffee became more in demand, and by the 18th century it had become the main luxury food in Western countries;
- England and Netherlands were already cultivating and selling the product, in abundance, in their colonies;
- The United States, which consumed a lot of coffee after gaining its independence, reduced its purchases of the product made in the English colonies and started to look for it elsewhere. Brazil was chosen because of its proximity, and because transportation was easier.

=== British influence ===
In breaking away from Portugal and claiming independence, Brazil ended up tying themselves to the will of Great Britain. Brazil owed Great Britain a considerable sum of money for a loan to pay off Portugal's compensation for loss of colony. Great Britain used the debt they were owed to accelerate the end of slavery in Brazil, hijacking slave ships entering the area. They also used their power of Brazilian trade to boosts Brazil's coffee exports. The British facilitated almost sixty percent of coffee sales across the globe. Joining British trading groups was a very appetizing opportunity for Brazilian farmers and merchants, since it was much lower risk and much higher reward than doing it themselves.

== The cycle ==
=== Coffee propagation and cultivation ===
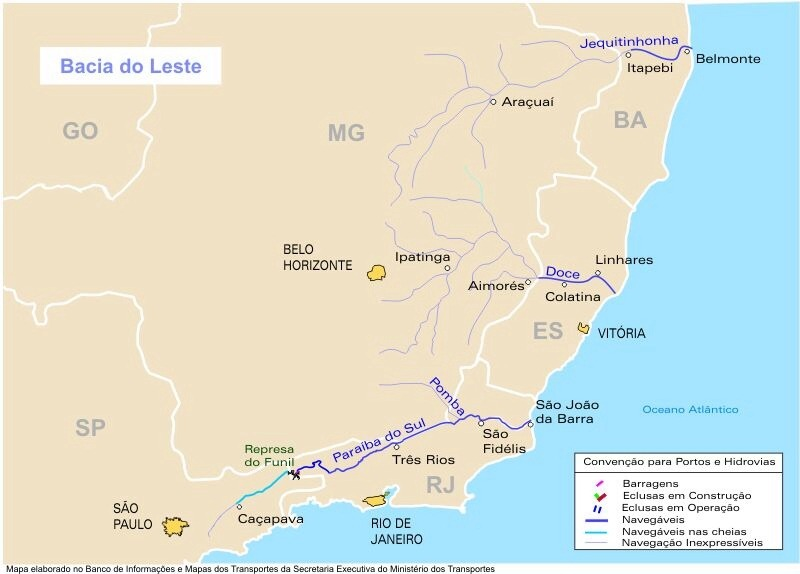
Paraíba do Sul, at the bottom of the map

Coffee was originally brought to in Brazil in 1727, when it was introduced in Pará, before it really gained a grasp on the Brazilian economy. It continued to gain popularity in Northeastern Brazil in the 1700s, permeating through Amazonas. By 1770, it had reached Rio de Janeiro. Coffee began to be planted near the coast, in relatively small quantities when compared to the amount that would be produced later. The first plantations appeared in the valleys of the mountains surrounding the city of Rio de Janeiro. The coffee plantations followed the coast, going beyond the state of Rio and reaching São Paulo. At the beginning of the 19th century, this coastal strip was an important producing area.

But the first great scenario of coffee farming was the Paraíba River Valley (between Rio de Janeiro and São Paulo). Having started to be cultivated in 1825, by the middle of the 19th century, the "largest portion of Brazilian wealth" was gathered there. The plantations followed the pattern of the great American Plantations – vast monocultural estates using slave labor. Upstream, the coffee plantations reached São Paulo and the border region of Minas Gerais.

Coffee used to be grown in a non, most appropriate way:

Until around 1870, the Paraíba river basin was the main coffee producing center. But it happened there what had already happened in the northern lands. Once again, no one thought to treat the soil, to plant properly. The rows of coffee climbed vertically up the hill. When it rained, the water ran through the ditches between one row and the next, carrying the soil. They also always planted in the same places, without giving the ground a rest. The forests were devastated, making the region arid, without the same rains as before. That area began to become impoverished. And this territory, which had once had been very abundant, began to produce less and less. The men left and the crops were abandoned.

— Enciclopédia Delta de História do Brasil [Delta Encyclopedia of Brazilian History] (in Portuguese). Rio de Janeiro: Delta S/A. 1969. p. 1705.

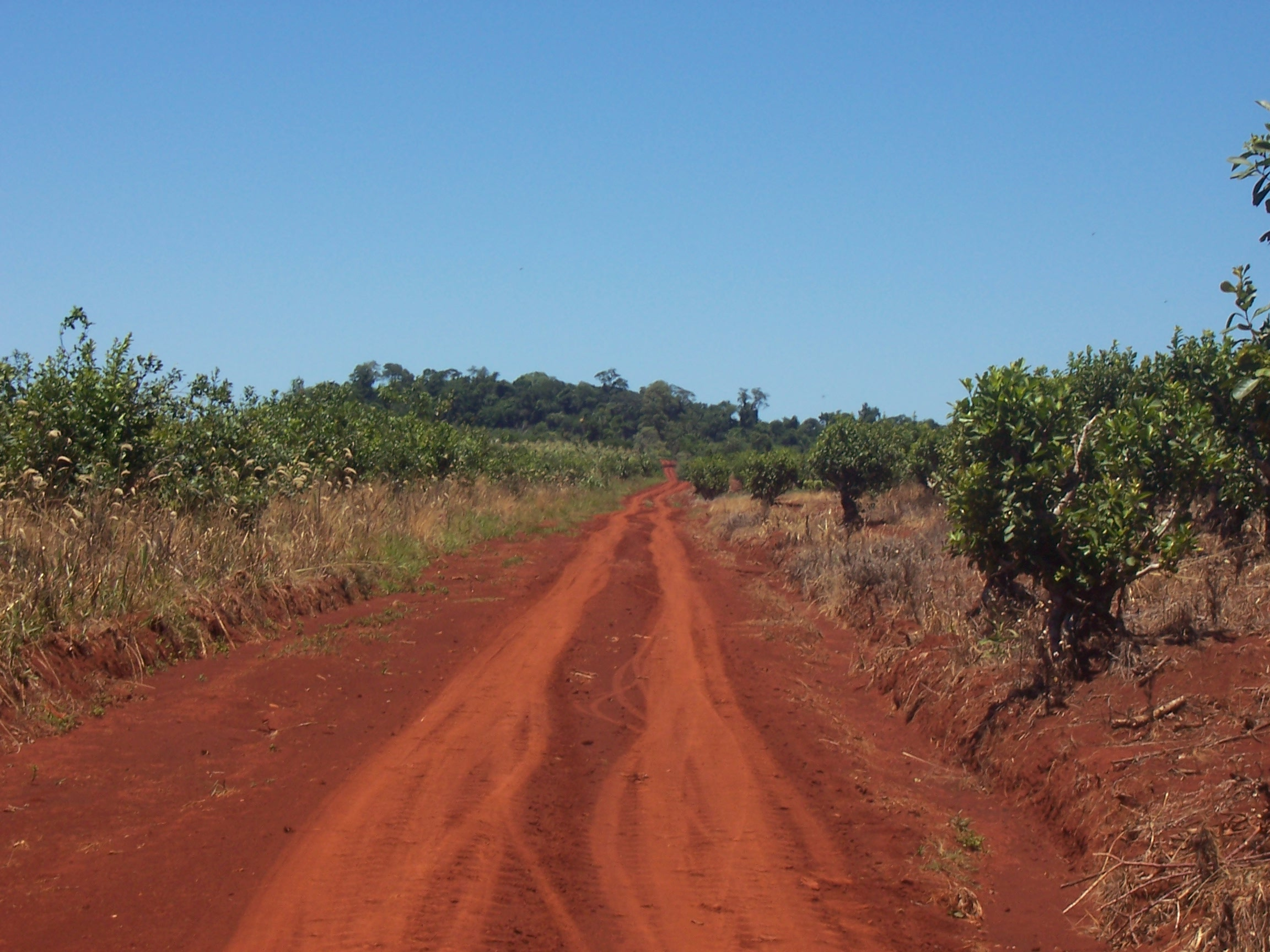
Purple soil

Later, at the end of the cycle, what happened to other products in Brazil would happen again to coffee: coffee would go through a phase of intense prosperity, followed by another of stagnation and decadence. This decline is caused by the depletion of the natural resources due to an intensive and careless exploitation system. The same pattern could be observed with other products, such as gold, sugar, cotton, and, in early colonial history, brazilwood. Not only was the form of cultivation similar to that of previous cycles, but also the plantation had similarities with earlier models of rural property. Like the sugar mills, the farm had facilities that made it an almost self-sufficient unit.

The Paraíba Valley was responsible for the coffee advance until 1870, when the west of São Paulo overtook its production. After the soil was worn down, the coffee moved inland, crossing the Serra do Mar and Mantiqueira mountains, penetrating the west of São Paulo province, where it found the plateau of purple latosol resulting from the decomposition of basaltic rocks of volcanic origin – the best soil for coffee. Unlike the Paraíba river valley, there were large plateaus in São Paulo, over which huge cultivated areas were spread. A "sea of coffee" was formed. At the end of the 19th century, coffee also reached the far west of the province of São Paulo, in the west of São Paulo, investment was made in free labor, especially that of the immigrants who arrived.

=== Workforce ===
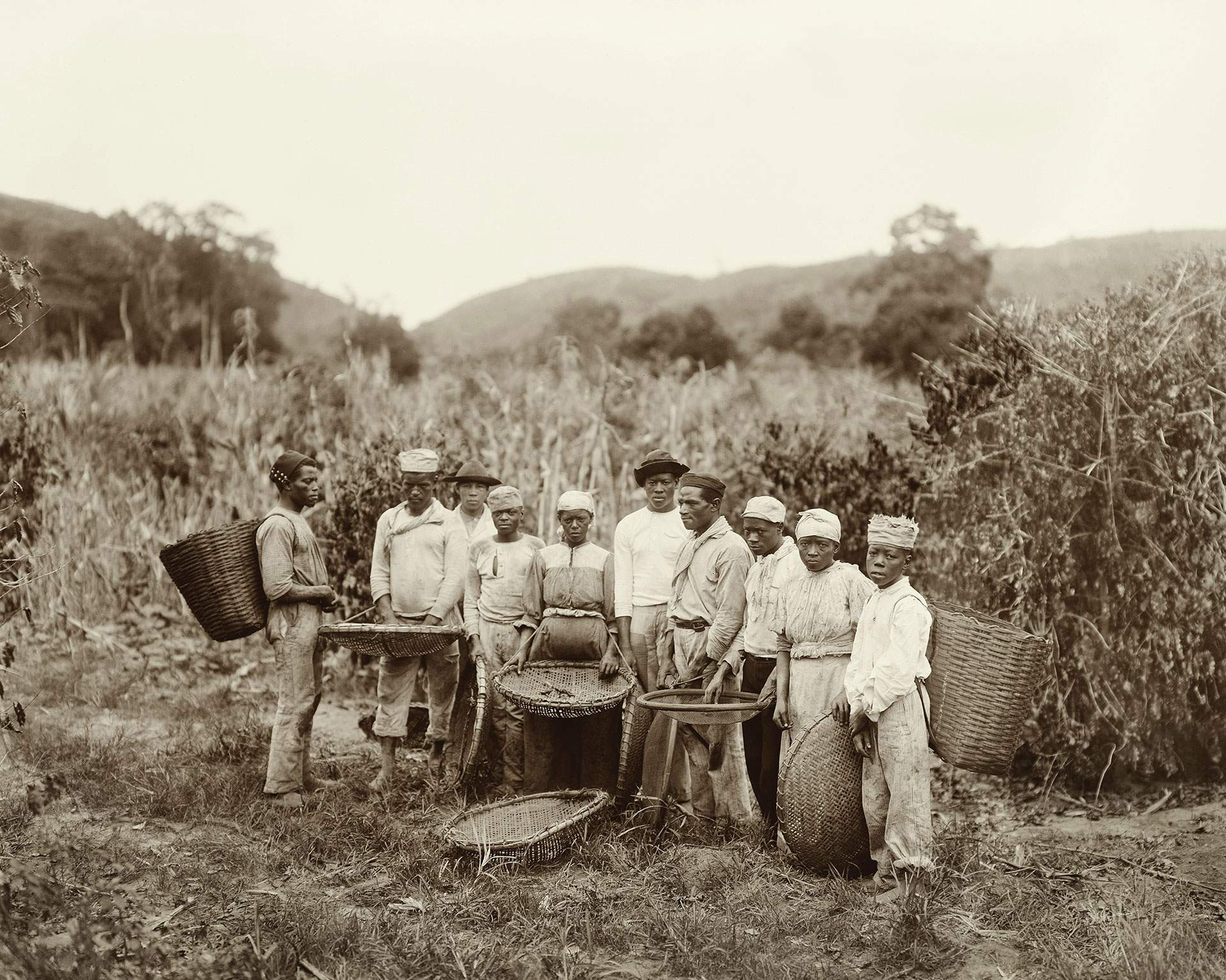
Slaves on a coffee plantation circa 1882

In the Paraíba Valley, slave labor was used. At the time, slaves were the exclusive source of the workforce. African slaves who had been brought across the Atlantic were being used for coffee production. With the prohibition of the African slave trade in 1850, it became increasingly difficult and expensive to acquire slave laborers. For some time, producers could rely on internal trafficking, diverting slaves from the impoverished regions of the north to the more prosperous south. But the constant increase in production required a growing labor force, and alternatives had to be found to solve the shortage of workers.

The solution was to use free labor: first through the partnership regime, and later with mass immigration at the end of the 19th and beginning of the 20th century. By 1847, senator Nicolau Vergueiro had brought European settlers to his farms through the so-called "partnership", or "half" system. In this system, the owner provides the land and the sharecropper (the one employed by this system) does the work, and the final product is divided between the two, half-and-half. The sharecropper, with his half, must still pay his expenses with clothing, food, etc., obtained from the landlord. In other words, he has very little left. This system was the cause of the Revolt of Ibicaba.

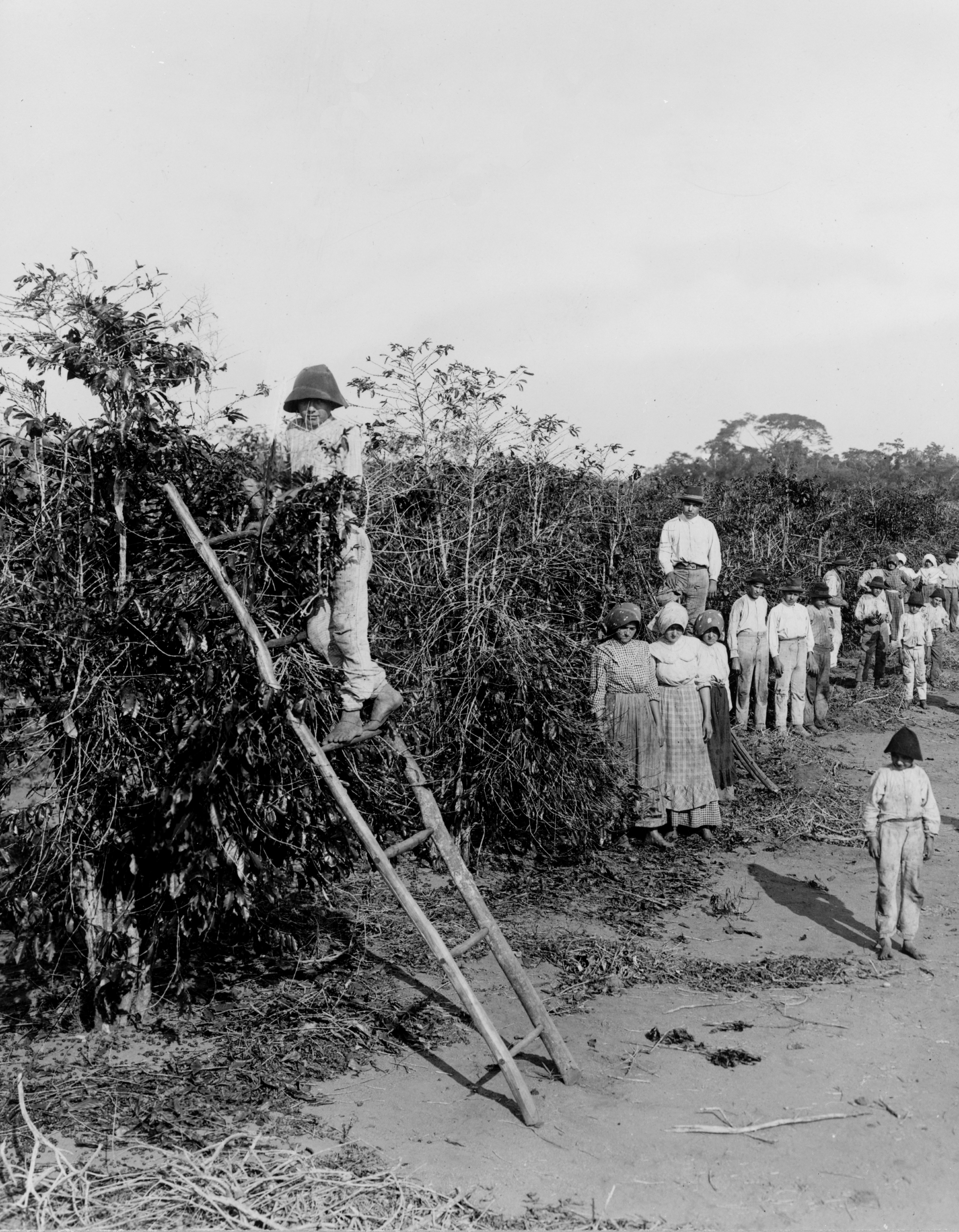
Italian immigrants on a coffee plantation at the beginning of the 20th century

The system was adopted by other farmers, but was not successful. Later, from the 1870s on, with the great increase in farming and with the forecast of the end of slavery soon to come, there was more interest in the adoption of free labor, but this time in a wage contract system, and no longer in the partnership system. The Italian immigrants came mainly because they were less demanding than the Germans, Swiss and others.

These immigrants at the beginning of the Republic were now brought from their countries of origin with official aid, and found sufficient support for their definitive settlement. The form of payment was also different. The settlers generally received a fixed annual salary and a further share at harvest time, which was variable. In addition, they were entitled to cultivate small areas for personal use. While these kept coffee as one of Brazil's main exports for the rest of the 1800s and some of the 1900s, the production and export of coffee clearly suffered from the loss of slavery. The cycle wasn't nearly as sustainable without free labor and slavery, even with all the new immigrants.

As previously mentioned, coffee cultivation in the Paraíba Valley was based on rudimentary techniques. Slave labor was precisely what made production remain rudimentary, because this labor regime is not a stimulus to innovation. In western São Paulo, on the other hand, the barons had a greater entrepreneurial spirit. In this region:

[...] changes have occurred in the processing of coffee, the step performed after harvesting and drying the beans. Modern machines, such as pulpers, fans and separators, performed alone the task that previously required the work of up to ninety slaves. The average productivity of the farms also increased, as well as the final quality of the product, which started to command better prices than its competitors in the Paraíba Valley. Costs decreased.

— Gomes – 1889, Laurentino (2013). 1889. São Paulo: Globo Livros. p. 157. ISBN 978-85-250-5515-6.

=== Fall of slavery ===
Brazil officially banned slavery in 1888. However, this was preceded by more and more restrictive laws on slavery, reducing the influx of slaves before officially abolishing slavery. As mentioned earlier, when Brazil cut off the introduction of new slaves to the region, it meant a lot of internal movement for slaves. Slaves were being moved where demand was higher, and this meant transferring from small and medium sized farms to the large plantations, making the rich even richer. The next step was legislation stating that children born of slave mothers would be free. However, it also required these children to live on the plantation until they were old enough to leave, which meant they essentially continued to live as slaves until they were able to move away. With more and more restrictions on slavery over the years, there was a gradual decrease in the number of slaves, which slowly began to affect the productivity and sustainability of the coffee cycle, forcing plantation owners to find other sources of labor.

=== Numbers ===
The bean was the country's main export product for almost 100 years. It was like this all the way to 1945, and coffee exports continued to amount to a third of Brazil's revenue even in 1970. Even during the Empire, Brazil became the world's leading coffee producer, accounting for more than 60% of all the country's exports. From 1860 onwards, the Brazilian trade balance showed positive balances; that is, the country sold more than it bought, which was unusual for the time, as the country usually imported more than it exported, since it needed to be industrialized and manufactured goods from more developed countries.

This development continued into the Republic (begun in 1889). During the first years of the new regime, in São Paulo, the number of coffee trees grew from 220 million in 1890 to 520 million in 1900. More than half the coffee consumed worldwide was Brazilian. On the other hand, all this coffee planting – which was no longer "sea", it was "ocean" – led to overproduction, starting the decline of the coffee cycle.

=== Decline ===
The overproduction caused by the "ocean" of coffee started a long process of decline in the cycle, which would last for several more decades. The amount of coffee being traded exceeded demand, both domestic and foreign. This overproduction generated two main problems:

- Falling prices – due to the law of supply and demand;
- Unsaleable stocks were built up. – As domestic and foreign markets were saturated and production exceeded demand, this surplus coffee was increasingly accumulated. For example, in 1905, the unsold stock was 11 million bags, or 660 million kilos, equivalent to approximately 70% of annual world consumption at the time.

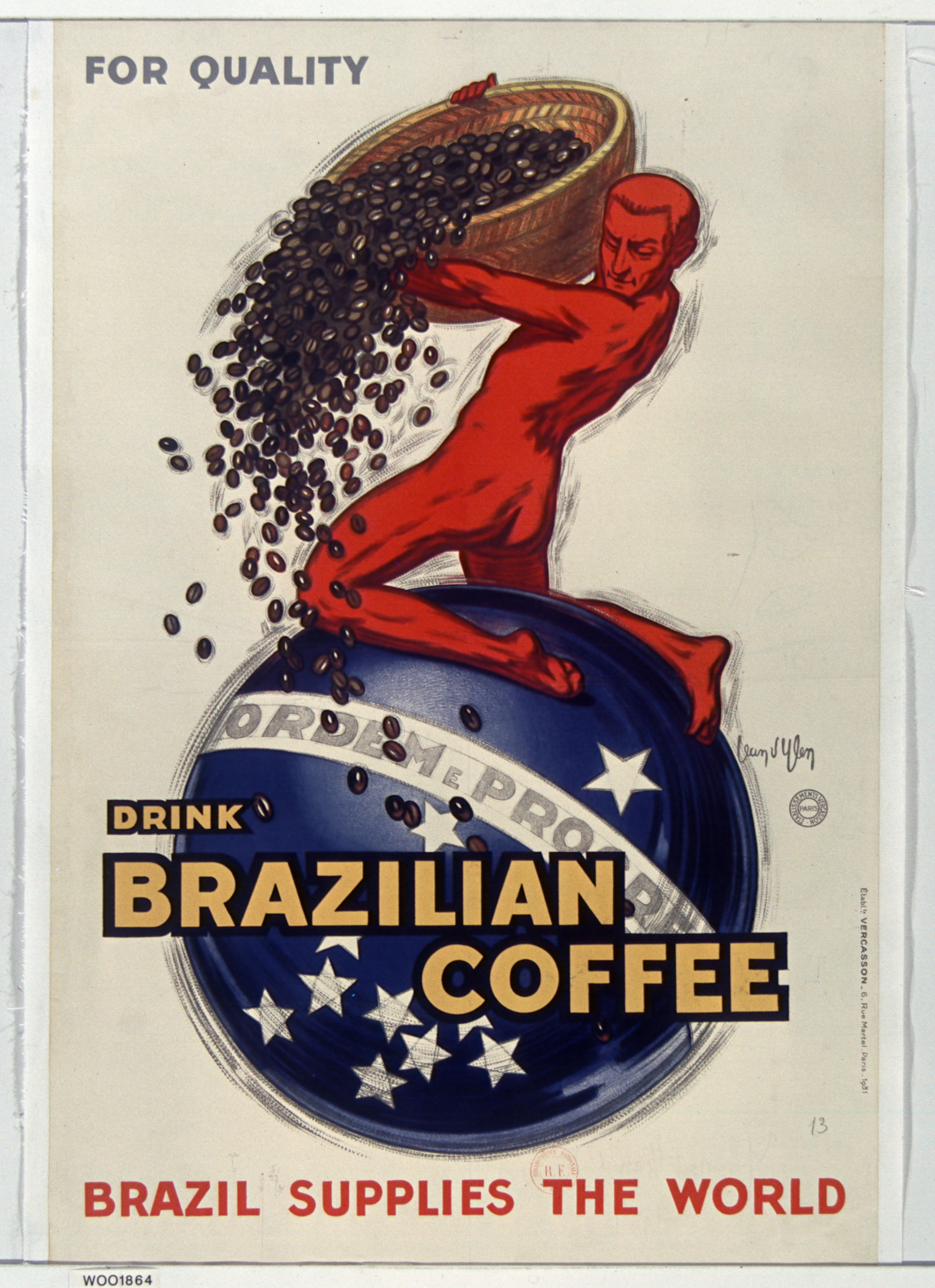
Parisian's advertisement (1931), by French artist Jean d'Ylen.

The crisis of overproduction could be circumvented for a time. The government of São Paulo, for example, established a tax for new plantations. But the fact that most contributed to decrease production was the producers' own lack of interest, since producing more meant increasing stocks and having more difficulties to sell. Thus, production fell by half over two decades: 150 million new Coffee trees were planted between 1901 and 1910, while 300 million had been planted in the previous decade.

In 1906, the Taubaté Agreement came into being, an agreement between the main coffee producing states that determined that the government should buy the surplus production, so that the producers would not suffer losses. Government purchases of coffee, as well as the burning of its stocks, were common practices throughout the decadence of the cycle. This state intervention all for the benefits of a class of rural producers increased the concentration of income in the country and delayed the development of other sectors, such as industry, in addition to postponing the end of the coffee cycle, which would only occur with the Revolution of 1930.

After the First World War, the government changed its strategy: it would no longer buy coffee, but only regulate its distribution, and it would do this through the Coffee Institute. This institution was allowed to retain surplus coffee. It prevented the supply of Brazilian coffee in international markets from exceeding demand, selling coffee at the right times. In this way, it had control over the price of the product. From 1926 on, the Institute even started to increase the prices of the product in the international market by increasing the retention of the commodity. This strategy was not successful either – and was further aggravated by the beginning of the great economic crisis, the Great Depression. With this crisis, the United States and Europe greatly reduced their coffee purchases, greatly harming coffee exports.

Coffee was so important in the national economy, and its crisis was so severe, that when asked who would lead the revolution against President Washington Luís, João Neves da Fontoura replied: "General Café". The journalist Assis Chateaubriand also affirmed that "General Café" was the enemy of the constituted order. The revolution that put Getúlio Vargas in power and removed Washington Luís from power was later known as the Revolution of 1930. Even with the end of the cycle, coffee did not disappear overnight; the plant continued to play an important role in the country's economic scenario.

== Consequences ==
=== Development of São Paulo and industrialization ===
The impact of coffee was invaluable. The consequence of the coffee cycle was the leadership of the state of São Paulo in the political and economic sphere. The state saw its population increase rapidly and became the industrial leader in the country. Since coffee gained so much popularity in São Paulo, and Southeast Brazil in general, it moved the center of Brazil from the Northeast to São Paulo and the Southeast. The money accumulated from coffee exports was one of the factors that allowed the country to begin a phase of progress, bringing the first industries, even though, Brazil remained an agricultural country with a colonial economic structure. In 1907, in the first general census of Brazilian industries, São Paulo had 16% of the industrial establishments, behind the then Federal District (Rio de Janeiro). However, with the increase in population and the development of coffee, the state quickly became responsible for 40% of industrial production.

=== Decline of the coffee barons ===
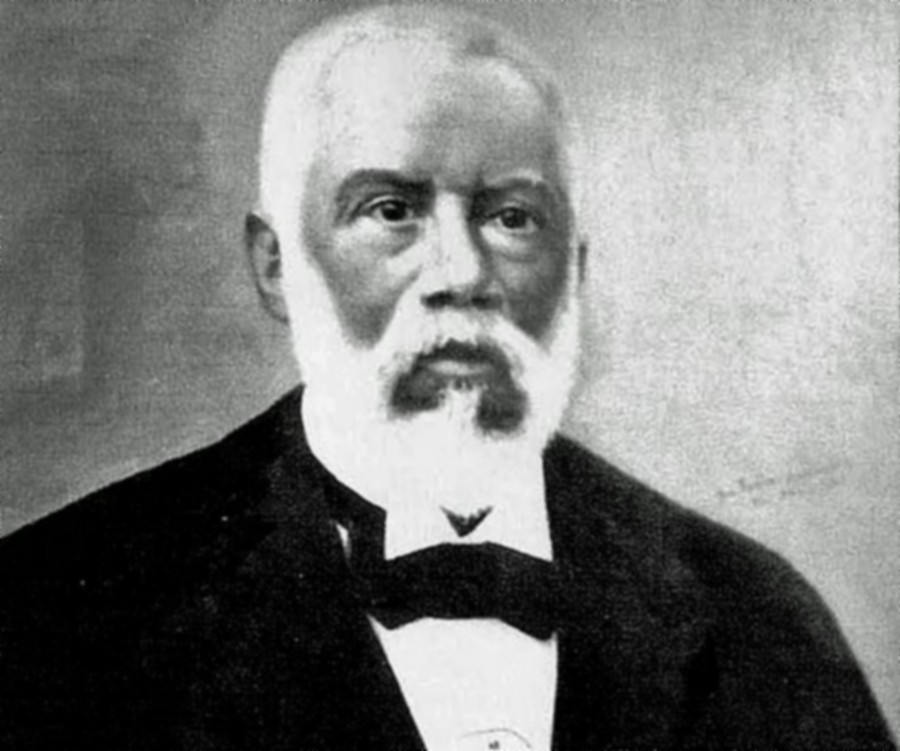
Francisco Paulo de Almeida (1826–1901), one of the richest coffee farmers, the first and only Baron of Guaraciaba, a title granted by Princess Isabel

With the end of the cycle, the last great social elite of Brazil also came to an end: after the sugar mill owners and the great miners, there were the so-called "coffee barons" (in Portuguese: barões do café). The baronage ended up being a kind of legitimization of local power, making them intermediaries between the people and the government. Pedro II distributed the title of baron in a significantly higher proportion than those who preceded him on the throne. In the last year of the monarchy, 1889, Brazil had 316 barons. This honor was generally dedicated to landowners who were noted for their material wealth. Thus, the baronage became the distinguishing mark of this class. These measures by the monarch aimed to maintain the elite's support for the regime, especially after the promulgation of the Golden Law. After this law, the granting of titles increased dramatically. Even so, many coffee barons supported the military coup that established the republican regime in Brazil.

=== Forced migration of slaves ===
With the prohibition of the international African slave trade in 1850 following the approval of the Eusébio de Queirós Law, it was necessary to resort to internal trafficking. This traffic took place between the Northeast, where sugar cane plantations were in decay, and the coffee producing regions in the Southeast, especially the Paraíba Valley. It was the largest forced migration in the history of Brazil. This migration generated important demographic changes. On the one hand, the number of slaves in the Northeast went from 774,000 to 435,000 between 1864 and 74. On the other hand, the number of slaves went from 645,000 to 809,000 in the coffee producing areas of the Southeast. The difference was greater in the province of São Paulo, which saw the number of slaves double (from 80 thousand to 174 thousand). The internal traffic was a great source of tax revenue for the government. In 1862, the taxes on the exit of slaves was responsible for most of the collection in the province of Alagoas. To this day, a little over half the Brazilian population is of European descent, while almost half is composed of mixed race or black people. This is largely due to the transatlantic slave trade and following internal movement of slaves in Brazil.

=== Slave rebellions ===
Slave revolts weren't overly uncommon on the coffee plantations of Brazil. In São Paulo, 1882, Felipe Santiago led a slave insurrection. The master of the plantation had caught wind of the planned uprising and gathered a small group of forces to quell the rebellion. The two groups engaged in battle, and after dealing some blows to the master and his forces, the slaves continued towards a nearby city, encouraging slaves on other plantations to join them. The plantation system made it easy for slave revolts to grow, gaining support from each plantation they rolled through. This was followed up by another revolt nearby in 1884. The power of white men and slave masters was evident in the legal proceedings that followed each small rebellion. The entire court would unite against the slaves, and masters could launch accusations of witchcraft, which was regarded as significant evidence against the revolutionaries. This showcases the gap in power that clearly existed in Brazil's mid-nineteenth century society. The coffee cycle set the stage for a number of conflicts between slaves and masters, no doubt accelerating the laws regarding slavery in Brazil.

=== Creation of railroads ===
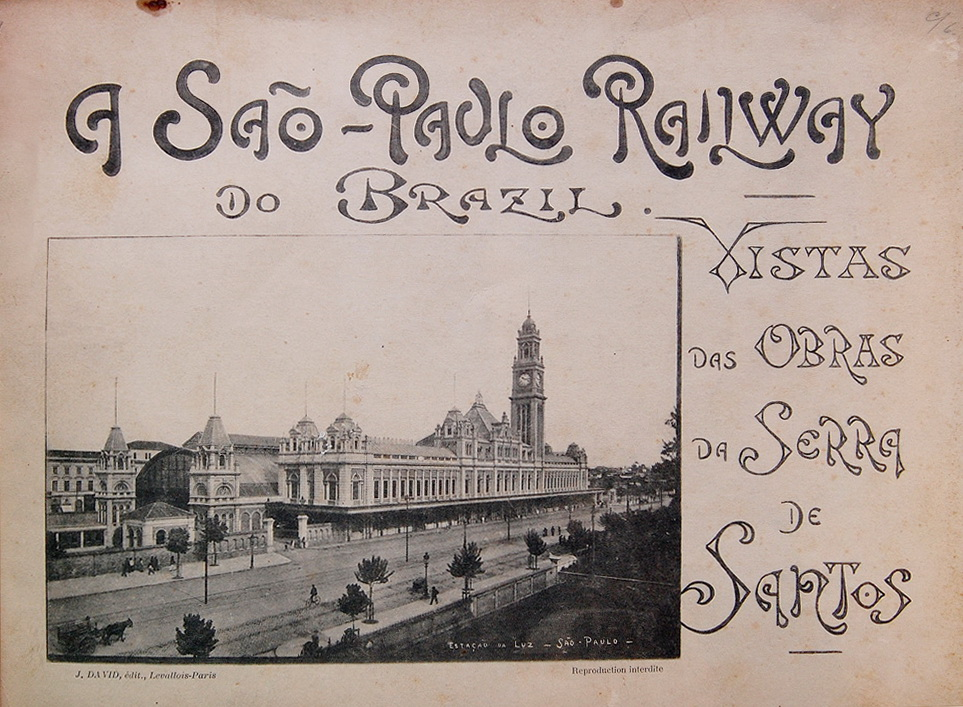
The São Paulo Railway, São Paulo's first railroad. The road was responsible for connecting the provincial capital to the port of Santos, one of the main outlets for coffee for export.

The plantations gave an enormous boost to the creation of a railroad network capable of transporting the product to the ports of Rio de Janeiro and São Paulo. In 1854, the first railroad in Brazil was built on the initiative of the then Baron of Mauá, connecting the Estrela beach in Rio to the mountains of Petrópolis. The wagons were pulled by the Baroneza locomotive. If in that year the country had 14.5 km (about 9 miles) of railroads, by 1899 this number had risen to 14,000 km (about 8,700 miles). Some 8,700 km (about 5,400 miles) were in the coffee-growing region alone. This was followed by the construction of the Dom Pedro II Railroad – later called the Estrada de Ferro Central do Brasil – and the Santos-Jundiaí railroad, among others. In 1860, a railroad was built connecting São Paulo to the port of Santos and production grew rapidly in the province in the 1880s and 1890s. In 1894, production passing through the port of Santos surpassed that of Rio de Janeiro and made the port the world's largest coffee exporting center.

These railroads were financed, in part, with British capital. The coffee cycle facilitated the access of British goods and capital to the Brazilian economy through political and economic pressure from England on Brazil. This process contributed to the establishment of a balance of payments whose equilibrium was sustained mainly by the export of primary products, especially coffee, which continued the sugar cycle in terms of a predominantly agricultural export agenda in the country.

Moreover, the expansion of the railroads in the midst of the coffee production centers accelerated the dependence of the rural areas on the urban centers, transforming the agrarian domain from a "barony" to a "center of industrial exploitation". One evidence of the city's greater role and importance is the fact that while the sugar mills were the residence of the lord of the mill, the coffee farms were seen as a source of income and a means to earn a living, and the large landowners lived in the cities. This creates a marked contrast to the colony's past. Before, the cities were practically abandoned. The mill owners visited them only occasionally, and it is possible to say that the city lived at the expense of the countryside, and not the countryside of the city, which is more common.

== Beyond coffee ==
Despite the supremacy of coffee, other agricultural products maintained their importance during the Empire. Sugar remained the second most exported product, even with strong competition from the Antilles and beet sugar made in Europe. Sugar remained in second place until 1860, when cotton overtook it. The prosperity of cotton at this time is due to the war of secession in the United States (1860s), in which the production of cotton in that country fell sharply, causing its buyers to seek Brazil. Rubber also had a period of prosperity, at the end of the 19th century, causing a surge of progress in Amazonas and bringing many northeasterners to that region. Extreme poverty was already making itself felt in the Northeast, and its inhabitants sought better living conditions, especially after the Great Drought. The growing automobile industry in the United States and England gave a boost to this product. Products such as sugar, tobacco, yerba mate and leather also developed during the coffee cycle. Today, coffee, soybeans, wheat, rice, and beef make up some of the main agricultural exports from Brazil, with textiles, shoes, chemicals, cement, lumber, and iron as some of the main industrial exports.

Percentage of total exports of the main agricultural products at the time
Decade	Coffee	Sugar	Cotton	Tobacco	Cocoa	Rubber
1830s	43.8	24.0	10.8	1.9	0.6	0.3
1840s	41.4	26.7	7.5	1.8	1.0	0.4
1850s	48.8	21.2	6.2	2.6	1.0	2.3
1860s	45.5	12.3	18.3	3.0	0.9	3.1
1870s	56.6	11.8	9.5	3.4	1.2	5.5
1880s	61.5	9.9	4.2	2.7	1.6	8.0
1890s	64.5	6.0	2.7	2.2	1.5	15.0

== See also ==
- Coffee production in Brazil
- Coffee King
- Economic history of Brazil
- Manuel Ernesto da Conceição, Count of Serra Negra
- Brazilian Gold Rush
- Brazilian cacao boom
- Brazilian sugar cycle
- Brazilian cotton cycle

== Bibliography ==
- Enciclopédia Delta de História do Brasil [Delta Encyclopedia of Brazilian History]. Vol. 7. Rio de Janeiro: Editora Delta S/A. 1969.
- Enciclopédia Delta de História do Brasil [Delta Encyclopedia of Brazilian History]. Vol. 8. Rio de Janeiro: Editora Delta S/A. 1969.
- Prado Júnior, Caio (1949). História econômica do Brasil [Brazil's Economic History] (1982 ed.). São Paulo: Editora Brasiliense.
- Edriano Abreu; Isabel Cristina Leite; Regiani Moutone Viviane Silva Gonzaga (2021). Bernoulli 2.ª Série Ciências Humanas e Linguagem [Bernoulli 2nd Series Humanities and Language]. Vol. 1. Belo Horizonte: Editora DRP.
- Baer, Werner (2012). A economia brasileira [The Brazilian economy] (12th ed.). São Paulo: Nobel. ISBN 978-85-213-1491-2.
- Holanda, Sérgio Buarque de (2014). Raízes do Brasil [Roots of Brazil] (27th ed.). São Paulo: Companhia das Letras. ISBN 978-85-359-2548-7.
- Schwarcz, Lilia Moritz (1997). As barbas do imperador: D. Pedro II, um monarca nos trópicos [The Emperor's Beard: Pedro II, a Monarch in the Tropics]. São Paulo: Companhia das Letras.
- Gomes, Laurentino (2013). 1889: Como um imperador cansado, um marechal vaidoso e um professor injustiçado contribuíram para o fim da Monarquia e a Proclamação da República no Brasil [1889: How a tired emperor, a vain marshal and a wronged professor contributed to the end of the Monarchy and the Proclamation of the Republic in Brazil]. São Paulo: Globo Livros. ISBN 978-85-250-5515-6.
