= Brazilian cacao cycle =

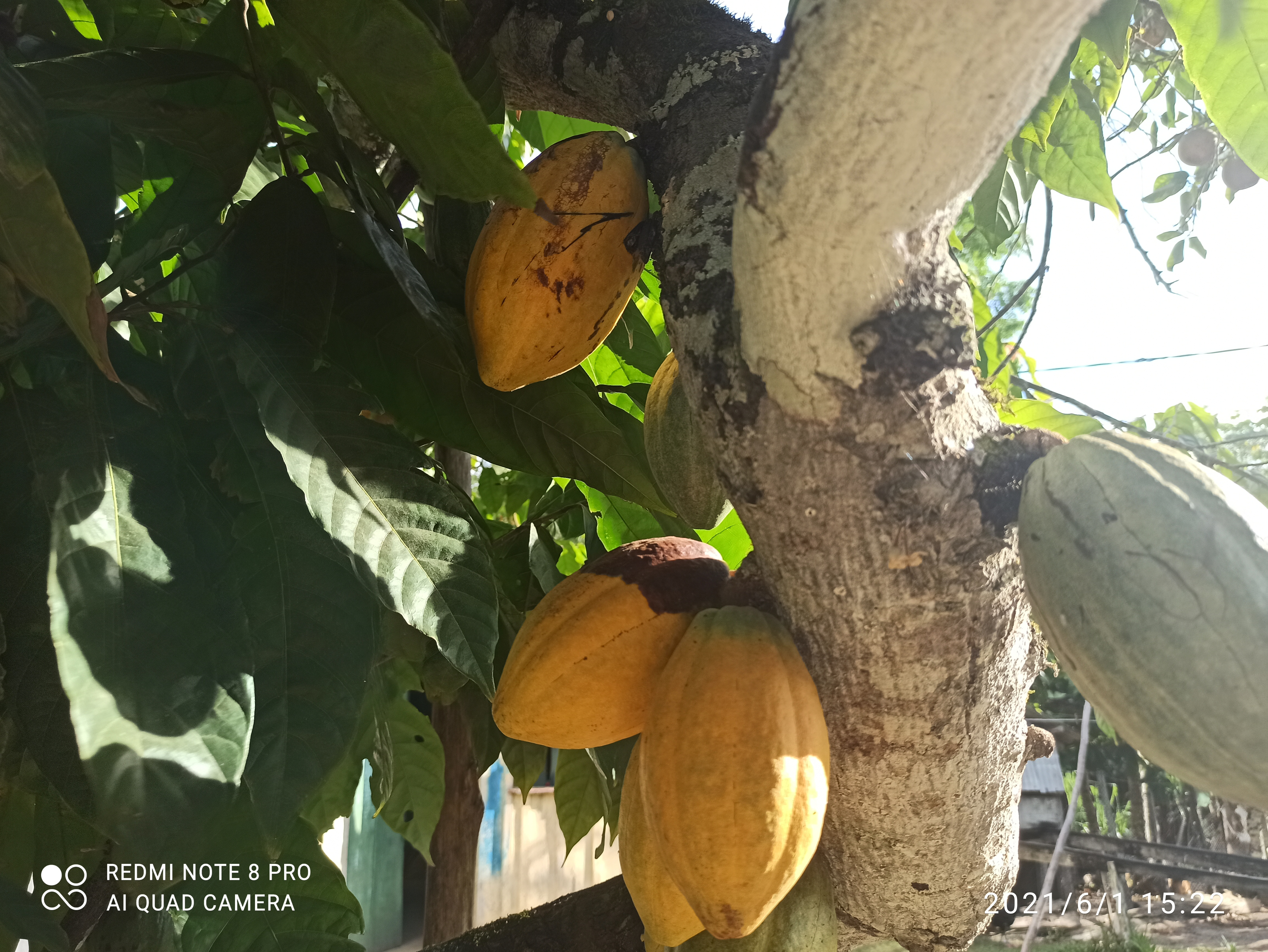
- Cocoa plantation in the rural area of Santa Luzia, Bahia, Brazil
- Duration: 19th and 20th centuries
- Location: South of Bahia, Brazil

The Brazilian cacao cycle or boom was a period in Brazil's economic history marked by the export of cocoa to consumer markets in Europe and North America.

The first cacao boom occurred simultaneously with the rubber boom, which brought wealth to the Amazon region. But while Brazil was the largest and almost exclusive producer of rubber, cacao was grown in many other places around the globe and in similar quantities. While this balance lasted, the Brazilian state of Bahia was able to enjoy a period of prosperity. This balance, however, was broken by the British, who established plantations of big proportions on the Gold Coast in Africa. Over time, this production took over the world market, weakening the cacao cycle in Bahia and leading it to a strong decline. Later, government programs made production grow again, generating a second export cycle but other crises led to a new decline. In 2021, the country was the seventh-largest world producer of cacao, with around 260,000 tons annually.

Themed by Jorge Amado, Adonias Filho, and many other writers, the cocoa boom created a rich and persistent tradition in regionalist cultural imagery and consolidated a place in Brazilian literature.

== History ==
=== Precedents ===
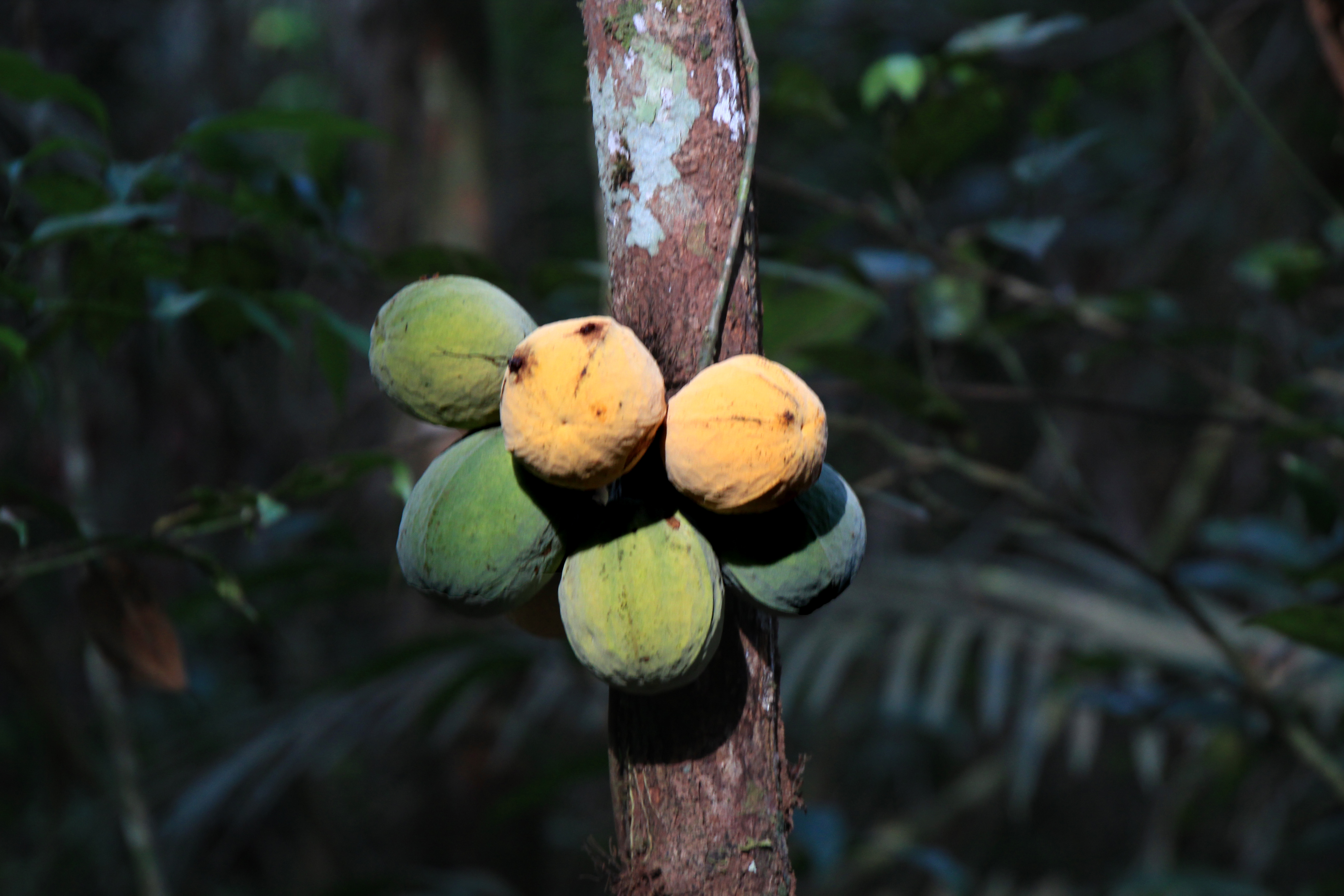
Wild cacao in the Tapajós National Forest

Cacao originated in the Amazon River basin. In 1641, the Jesuit Cristóbal Acuña noted, referring to wood, cacao, tobacco, and sugar cane: "There are in this great river of the Amazons four things that, if well cultivated, will without a doubt be sufficient to enrich not only one but many kingdoms," and speaking specifically of cacao, he said that "processed, it becomes of so much benefit, that each cacao tree can yield, annually, eight reals of silver, free of any expenses. And one can see how little work is required to cultivate such plants on this river, because, without any artifice, nature alone fills them with abundant fruit."

In 1681, the Portuguese government exempted cacao exports from taxes, however, they only became dominant in the regional economy in the early 18th century. Cacao was the first activity of great economic importance in the Amazon, and its production remained high until it was supplanted by Bahia. But, at this time, it was essentially an extractive activity, harvesting cacao in the wild, rather than having an organized system of plantations. In 1655, there is the first reference of the presence of cacao in southern Bahia.

In 1746, a French colonizer living in Pará, Luiz Frederico Warneau, sent seeds of the "Forastero" variety (from the Amelonado group) to a farmer from Bahia, Antônio Dias Ribeiro, who sowed them in the municipality of Canavieiras. In 1752, the first seeds were planted in Ilhéus and there they adapted to the hot and humid climate, similar to that of its natural habitat, relying on the shade offered by the taller trees of the Atlantic Forest to survive.

Cacao was then envisioned as an alternative for creating export income at a time when sugarcane farming was in crisis, but there was still no technical know-how to foster production efficiently. The beginning of commercial cacao planting took place in the 1830s and developed throughout the 19th century, becoming a factor of economic development in a region that still lacked dynamism.

=== First cycle ===
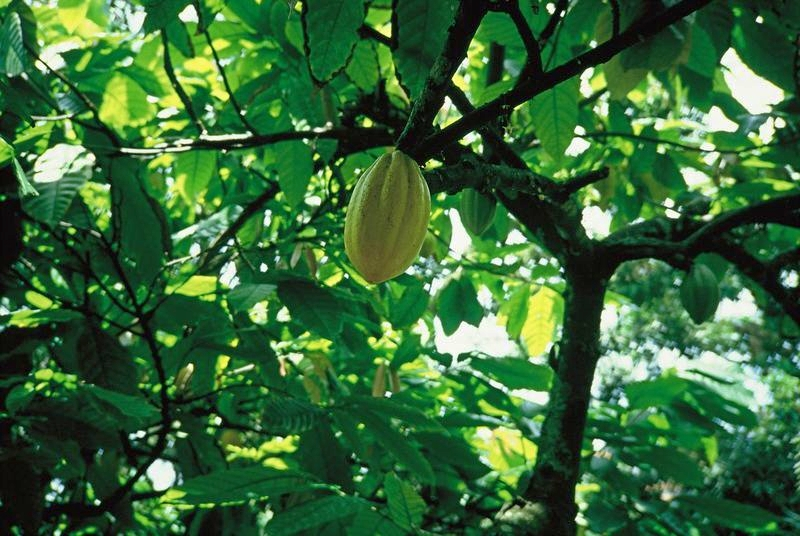
Cacao plantation in Ilhéus

Bahia remained in a secondary position concerning the other producing regions until the 1890s, when it started to take the lead, producing more than 3.5 thousand tons. From this date on, Brazil gained prominence in the world market and effectively began the first great export cycle. In 1895, southern Bahia was already exporting 112,000 sacks. Being exported to the United States and Europe, it became the main product of the economic and export basis of southern Bahia.

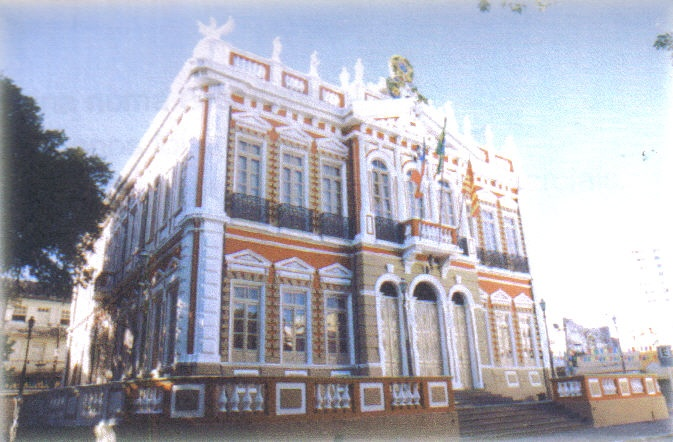
Paranaguá Palace

Brazil was ranked as the world's largest producer from 1901 until the mid-1920s, during which time southern Bahia became known for its own culture, marked by land struggles, jagunços, and the luxury of the cacao "colonels". The prospect of wealth increased the arrival of many immigrants from other regions of Bahia and Sergipe, accentuating the settlement of the area.

At this time, the construction of luxurious public buildings began, such as the Paranaguá Palace, which houses the City Hall to this day, and the headquarters of the Ilhéus Commercial Association. Grand houses, such as that of Colonel Misael Tavares and the Berbert family, a copy of the Catete Palace in Rio de Janeiro, stand out.

In the 1920s, Ilhéus was teeming with people, luxury, and wealth. In this period, the Ilhéos Hotel was built, the first building in the countryside of the Northeast with an elevator, and the Municipal Theater, considered at the time one of the best equipped outside the capital. The wealthiest individuals were attentive to the refined customs and fashions of the Federal Capital, at the time the city of Rio de Janeiro, and also to those practiced in Europe.

In this period, the export of cacao was carried out through the port of Salvador, causing problems such as difficulty in shipping, and loss in quality and weight of the production. In 1924, the cacao growers started the construction of the port of Ilhéus with their resources, and cacao exportation started to take place in the city, bringing with it the presence of foreigners and a cultural interchange with European countries. At this time, dancers, magicians, and also adventurers came to entertain the upper class.

The wealth derived from the cacao boom propelled the elevation of the Village of Ilhéus to the category of city and ensured that it became one of the most important cities in Bahia. Ilhéus not only was the regional production distribution center but was at this time the largest cacao producer in the state, in addition to triggering the formation of several other cacao towns in the surrounding area, which contributed to the establishment of the bean in the economic scenario of Bahia and Brazil.

However, cacao production in Brazil began to weaken when the British started planting cacao on the Gold Coast in West Africa:

It is true that Brazil continued to increase its production [after the development of cacao on the Gold Coast]: in approximate value, 21,000 tons in 1905, 45,000 in 1915, and 64,500 in 1925. But these increases were negligible compared to the value of the English colony's production. To give the reader an idea, already during the second republic, in 1935, Brazil produced 100,000 tons, against 260,000 on the Gold Coast. Brazil maintained its second place in world production, but a very mediocre second place, very distant.

— Delta Encyclopedia of Brazilian History, vol. 8 (1969), p. 1806

=== Second cycle ===
Until the end of the 1920s, the cacao economy had no regulation or state protection. It began with the foundation in 1931 of the Cacau of Bahia Institute ("Instituto de Cacau da Bahia", ICB), starting the so-called "second cycle", which would last until 1957 when a new crisis occurred and the executive committee of the Cocoa Farming Plan ("Comissão Executiva do Plano da Lavoura Cacaueira, CEPLAC") was created.

In the context of the economic crisis of 1929, the ICB emerged with the objective of financing and promoting the commercialization of cacao. Its first decade of activity was very successful, registering an increase of more than 100% in production through the expansion of the cultivated area and attending to the main problems of cultivation: transportation, commercialization, and financing. In the early 1940s, cultivation was again consolidated.

Despite the difficulties encountered in the following decades, among them falling international prices, pests and droughts, cacao remained an important source of foreign exchange for the country. Between 1953 and 1960 alone, Bahia's exports generated around 104 million dollars, constituting the second-largest revenue on the Brazilian export agenda. However, as a byproduct of a monoculture economy, according to Franco et al., the region experienced "all the consequences of this condition: dependence on the foreign market, importation of necessities, a dominant bourgeoisie, exploitation of rural workers' labor, and marked social inequalities."

In the meantime, the ICB was entering decadence as a regulatory and development agency. Since 1941, transformed into a state autarchy, it was immersed in political disputes, suffered from a lack of resources, and lost credibility. As an aggravator, in 1957, a new crisis hit productivity and international prices. According to Franco et al, "the producers were impoverished, indebted, and disillusioned, thinking it was the end of the cacao cycle." The creation of CEPLAC that same year, a public research institution linked to the Ministry of Agriculture, was an emergency intervention by the federal government. At the same time, the government determined the direct involvement of Banco do Brasil's Foreign Trade Portfolio in cacao trade operations.

=== Federal Intervention ===
The Bahia producers resisted the federal intervention and continued to see the ICB as the only legitimate representative body of the sector. In 1961, the federal government reinforced CEPLAC's commanding role by creating an exchange retention fee. From then on CEPLAC would be consolidated with an organized plan of action, a body of effective employees, and a stable financial base. In 1962, linked to CEPLAC, the Centro de Pesquisas do Cacau (CEPEC; Center for Cocoa Research) was created. In 1964, the Department of Rural Extension was created, and in 1965 the Technical School. Thus, CEPLAC assumed a leading role in scientific research, the creation of new techniques and technologies, the dissemination of knowledge, and the modernization of the production system. Producers also benefited from the creation in 1965 of the National Rural Credit System, offering a large volume of financing, negative interest rates, and flexible payment terms.

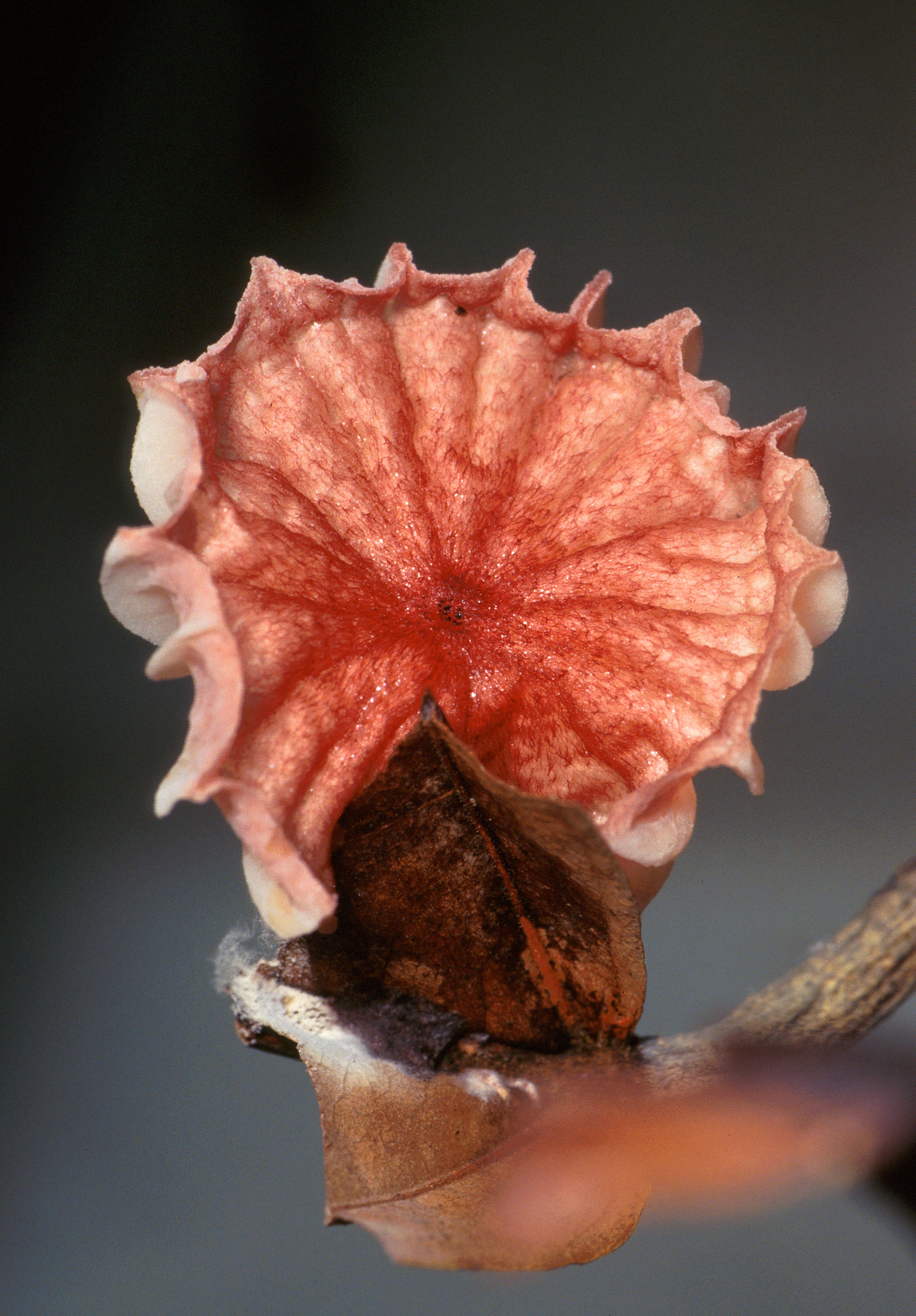
The witch's broom.

In the 1970s, the government gave new incentives for exports, and in 1976 created the Program and Guidelines for the Expansion of Cacao Cultivation (PROCACAU), aiming to revitalize 150,000 hectares of decaying plantations and create 300,000 hectares of new producing areas in other states. Between 1977 and 1979, cacao generated about US$2.4 billion. More than 400,000 tons of beans were harvested in the country in the record harvest of 1984/1985 and a foreign exchange revenue of US$1 billion was generated.

In 1989, another crisis began with the arrival of the "witch's broom" plague, endemic in the continent, a fungus that attacks the leaves of the trees and leads to a drop in production, which decreased from 400 thousand tons to 98 thousand tons in 2000, lagging behind the Amazon production. The result of the plague was the unemployment of about 200 thousand people, rural flight, degradation of natural resources, devaluation of land, indebtedness of producers, and impoverishment of the population. CEPLAC promoted strategies based on 4 types of control of the plague.Experts indicated that the low genetic variability of the trees made them vulnerable to the plague, and that cloned plants are more resistant to the witch's broom.

Other pests also appeared: the "machete disease", caused by the fungus Ceratocystis cacaofunesta, the bud mite, and "brown rot", caused by the fungus Phytophthora palmivora, which attacks the fruit. The situation of the crop became critical, worsened by the great expansion of cacao farming in Asia, facing a drop in international prices.

The recovery from the last crisis has been difficult, and the Amazon took the lead producing 53.2% of Brazilian cacao. Because of pests and other problems, in 2020, productivity per hectare in the Northeast was the lowest of all producing regions, which currently includes the Midwest and small areas in northern Minas Gerais and Espírito Santo. Adding up the total production, in 2020 Brazil was the seventh largest producer in the world, with 265,000 tons, supplying mainly the domestic market, with 72,500 tons destined for export. In 2021 the Ministry of Agriculture announced a program to expand Brazilian production by 60,000 tons within four years.

== Presence in culture ==
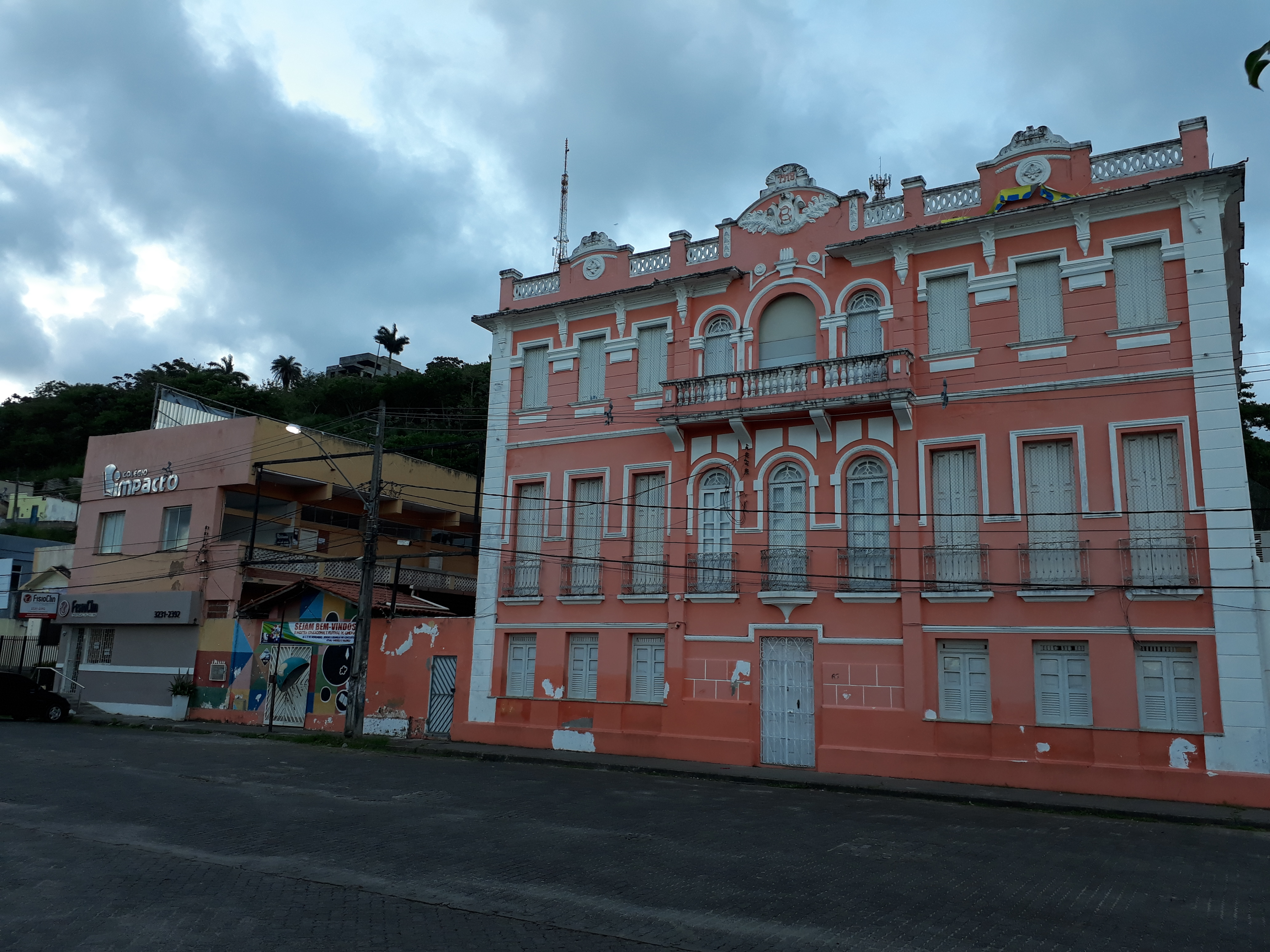
Colonel Berbert's palace, currently occupied by Colégio Impacto

The writer Jorge Amado was the main narrator of literature from the cacao area, the backdrop of the author's childhood. With his works Cacau (1932), Terras do Sem-Fim (1942), São Jorge dos Ilhéus (1944), and Gabriela, Cravo e Canela (1958), which focused mainly on the power struggles of the "cacao colonels" and on cacao as the source of dramas, of an entire cultural imaginary, and an unjust and violent social context, Amado was responsible for introducing the theme of the cacao cycle (boom) into Brazilian regionalist literature in prose and poetry. Jorge Medauar, Telmo Padilha, Florisvaldo Matos, Plínio Aguiar, Cyro de Mattos, Adonias Filho, and others also worked with this theme in varied approaches.

Works such as Terras do Sem-Fim (1943) and Gabriela, Cravo e Canela (1958) were adapted into television dramas. The 1993 show Renascer, as well as its 2024 remake, also explored Brazil's cacao industry.

== See also ==
- Brazilian Gold Rush
- Amazon rubber boom
- Coffee cycle
