= Brazilian cotton cycle =

Cotton boom in Brazil from the 18th to 19th century

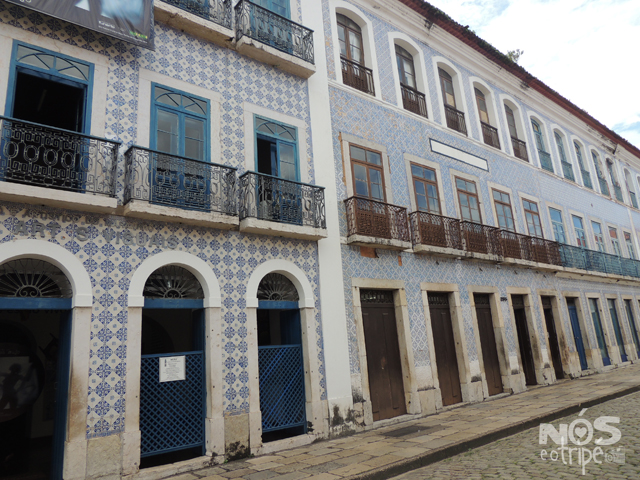
- Historical Center of São Luís
- Duration: From the 18th to the 19th century
- Location: Maranhão and Pernambuco, Brazil
- Participants: Farmers, slaves, and the Portuguese
- Outcome: Economic expansion of the Captaincy of Maranhão; increase in slavery in Maranhão, and demographic changes

The cotton cycle refers to the period when this product had great prominence in the Brazilian economy, especially in Maranhão and Pernambuco, between the mid-eighteenth to the beginning of the nineteenth century, being responsible for strong economic growth in the region. In the colonial period, cotton was also developed in the Captaincy of São Vicente, from where the product was exported to Rio de Janeiro and Bahia. Other regions produced it for local consumption and to manufacture cloth for slaves.

This cycle developed in the context of an economic crisis in the colony with the end of the gold cycle and the competition of the sugar production in the northeast with the production in the Antilles, the beginning of the Industrial Revolution, and the War of Independence of the United States (main supplier of the product to England).

== Predecessors ==
In 1621, the Philippine dynasty created the State of Grão-Pará and Maranhão, comprising the present territories of Maranhão, Ceará, Piauí, Pará, and Amazonas, directly subordinated to the Portuguese crown. The main economic activities of this region were sugar production, tobacco cultivation, cattle raising (for the export of hides), and cocoa collecting. Most of the population lived in conditions of extreme poverty, surviving on gathering, fishing, and subsistence agriculture.

From the middle of the 17th century, the state of Maranhão faced an economic crisis, as since the expulsion of the Dutch from the Northeast region of Brazil, the regional sugar company could not afford the high costs of importing African slaves and began to face the competition of sugar from the Antilles. In this context, the action of Father António Vieira (1608–1697) was important. In the 1650s, as Superior of the Jesuit Missions in the state of Maranhão, he established the bases of missionary action in the region: Preaching, baptism, and education, in the molds of Portuguese culture and the rules established by the Council of Trent (1545–1563).

There was a conflict between the rural producers and the Jesuits because the latter prevented the use of enslaved indigenous labor. The evangelized Indians were the labor force used by the religious to collect the so-called "drugs of the sertão". Faced with these aggressions, the Society of Jesus appealed to the Crown, which intervened and prohibited the enslavement of the indigenous, since this did not bring profits to the Metropolis.

In an attempt to solve the issue, the Crown established the Maranhão Commerce Company (1682), which had the monopoly of all commerce in Maranhão for a period of twenty years, with the obligation to introduce ten thousand African slaves (at the rate of five hundred individuals per year), trading them on the term, at fixed prices, as well as supply manufactured textiles and other European goods needed by the local population, such as cod, wines, and wheat flour. In return, it had to send to Lisbon at least one ship a year from Maranhão and another from Grão-Pará, with local products. Cocoa, vanilla, pau-cravo wood, and tobacco, produced in the region, would be sold exclusively to the company, at fixed prices.

Unable to adequately fulfill its commitments, the company's operation aggravated the economic crisis and increased discontent in the region, which triggered conflicts such as the Beckman's Revolt. The revolt was suppressed and later the company was extinguished by the Crown.

== Pombal period ==
In 1755 the Marquis of Pombal created the Grão Pará and Maranhão Company, which was to guarantee the coming of African slaves to the colony, with a monopoly on navigation and foreign trade, as well as provide credit for local producers and the introduction of better agricultural techniques. Later, the Marquis also promoted the expulsion of the Jesuits from the Portuguese colonies.

In 1772 the Marquis divided the state into two administrative units: The State of Maranhão and Piauí (headquartered in São Luís); and the State of Grão-Pará and Rio Negro (headquartered in Belém).

With the growing demand for cotton, a fundamental raw material for the English textile industry, as well as the interruption of American exports due to the United States War of Independence, declared in 1776, the colony experienced strong economic growth. Another important buyer of cotton from Maranhão was France.

Since 1661 there have been records of cotton production in Maranhão, but it was focused on domestic supply. Between 1760 and 1771, cotton exports in the state increased from 651 to 25,473 arrobas. The annual movement of ships in São Luís increased from three to twenty-six in 1788.

== Expansion ==
In 1780 cotton accounted for about 24% of Brazil's exports, while sugar accounted for about 34%.

In 1818, Maranhão's economy reached one million pounds and moved 155 ships, making it Brazil's fourth largest economy. In this period, São Luís was the fourth most populous city in Brazil. The economic heyday of this period is represented by the construction of the mansions of the Historical Center of São Luís and Alcântara. Cotton represented about between 73% and 82% of Maranhão's exports in the late 18th and early 19th century.

About 83.70% of Brazil's cotton exports came from Grão-Pará and Maranhão and Pernambuco (which encompassed Paraíba).

Between 1791 and 1801 Brazilian cotton accounted for 40% of the fiber traded in Liverpool, the main market for the product.

== Slavery ==
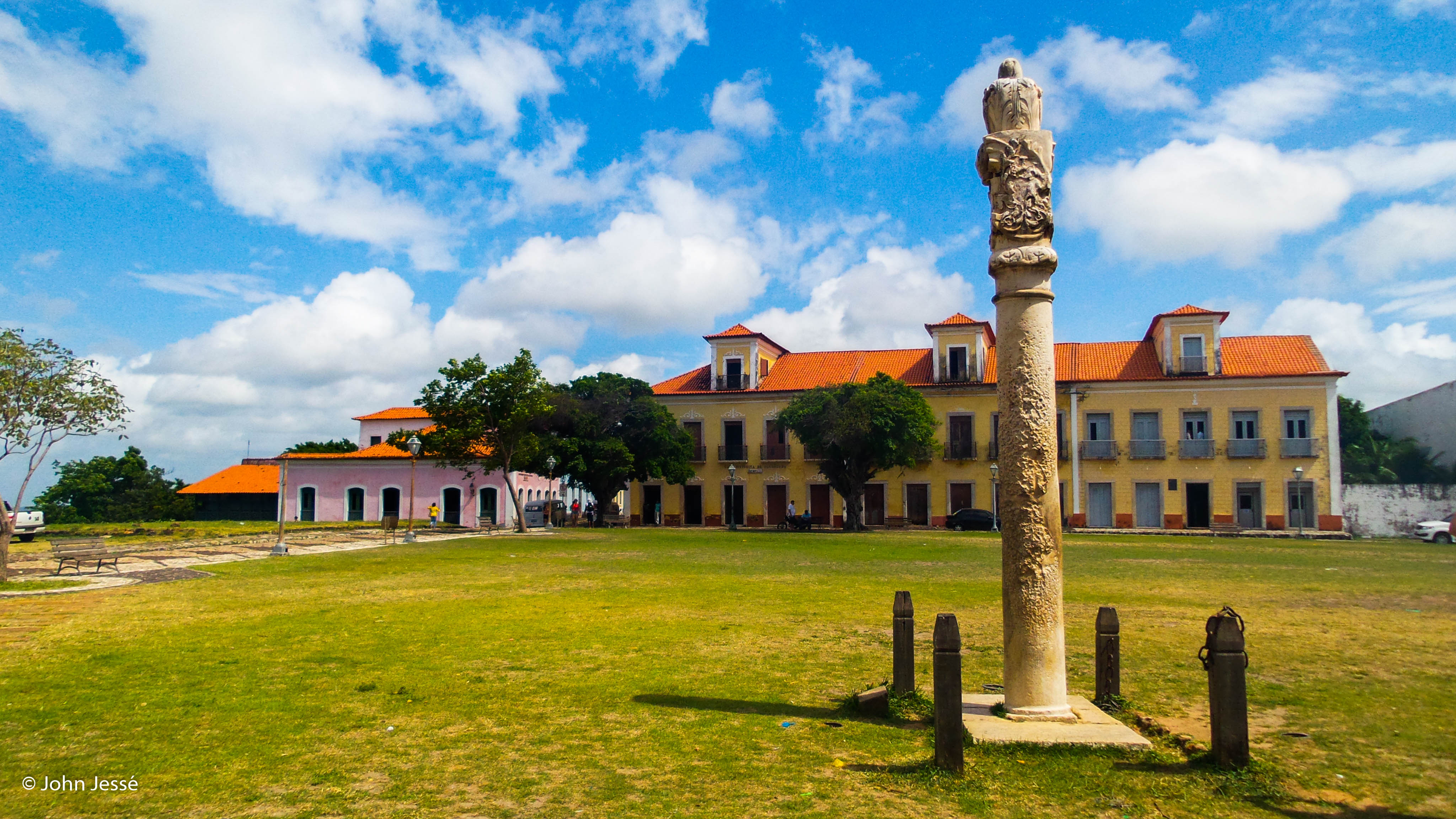
Pelourinho (pillar of stone, or less often of wood, erected in a public place, by which criminals were exposed and punished), in Alcântara.

Between 1756 and 1788, about 30,000 Africans disembarked in Belém and São Luís, 70% of them from Guinea and the rest from Angola.

By 1798 the enslaved represented 47% of the population, a number that rose to 55% in the second decade of the 19th century, while the white population represented 16%. In the Itapecuru valley, the number of enslaved people reached 80%.

The exploitation of slave labor was one of the preponderant factors for the cotton cycle in Maranhão, causing a strong demographic and social change in the colony, with effects that extended after the abolition of slavery, such as a marked social inequality.

== Economic decadence ==
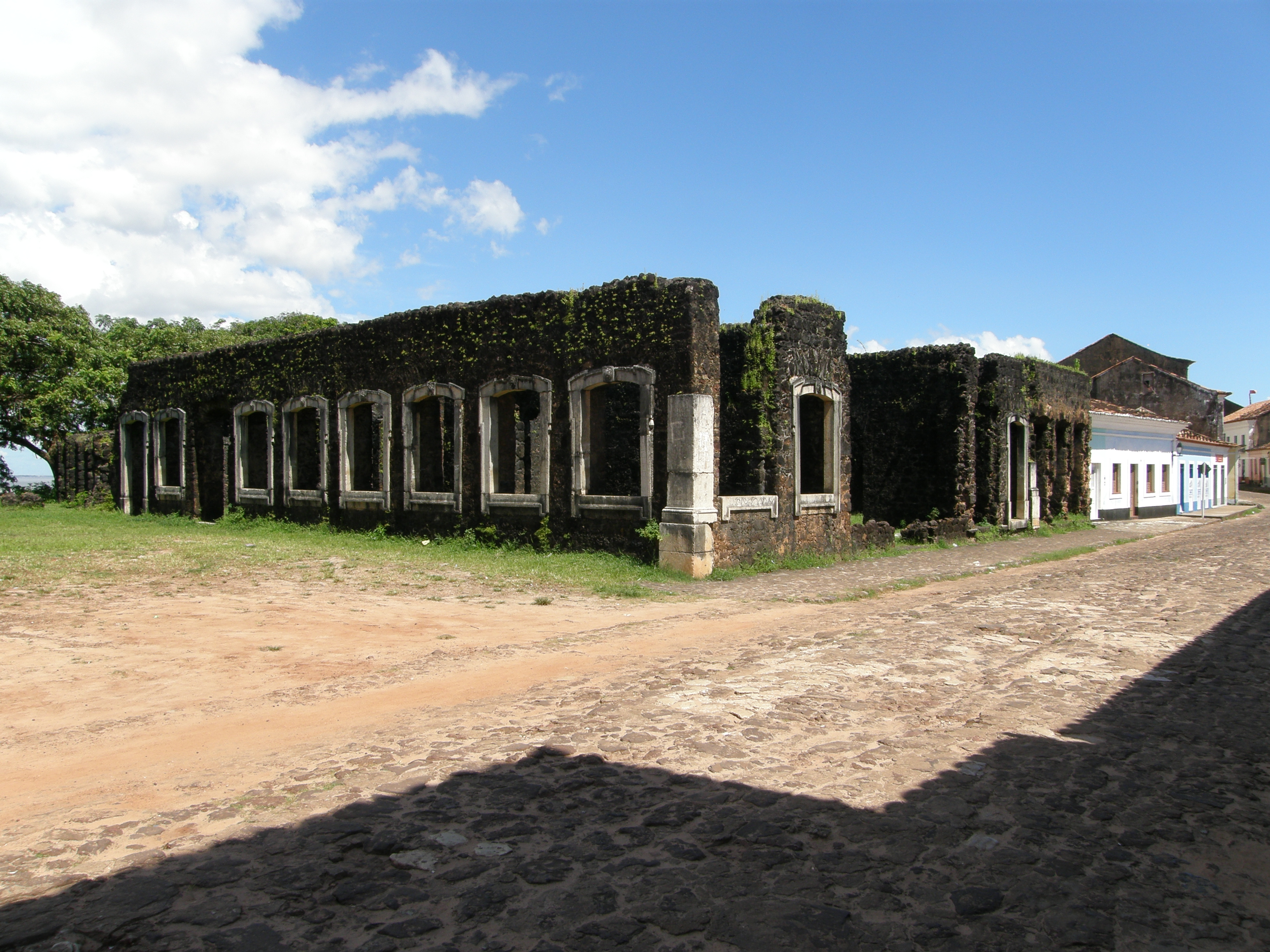
Ruins of the Baron of Pindaré Palace, in Alcântara

From 1820 on, with the return of the United States to the international market, with higher productivity and more advanced techniques, the Maranhão economy lost strength, with a 70% drop in prices.

In the following decades, coffee gained space in the Brazilian economy and prominence in exports.

The province became economically and socially unstable, with conflicts such as the Balaiada (1838–1841), a popular movement against the rural aristocracy.

During the American Civil War (1860–1865) Maranhão went through a brief period of economic expansion, and again fell into decadence in the following decades, having to face the end of the slave trade to Brazil, the internal traffic between the provinces, and later the abolition of slavery.

== See also ==
- Brazilian cacao cycle
- Brazilian sugar cycle
- Brazilian coffee cycle
- Amazon rubber cycle
- Brazilian Gold Rush
