= Gold mining in Brazil =

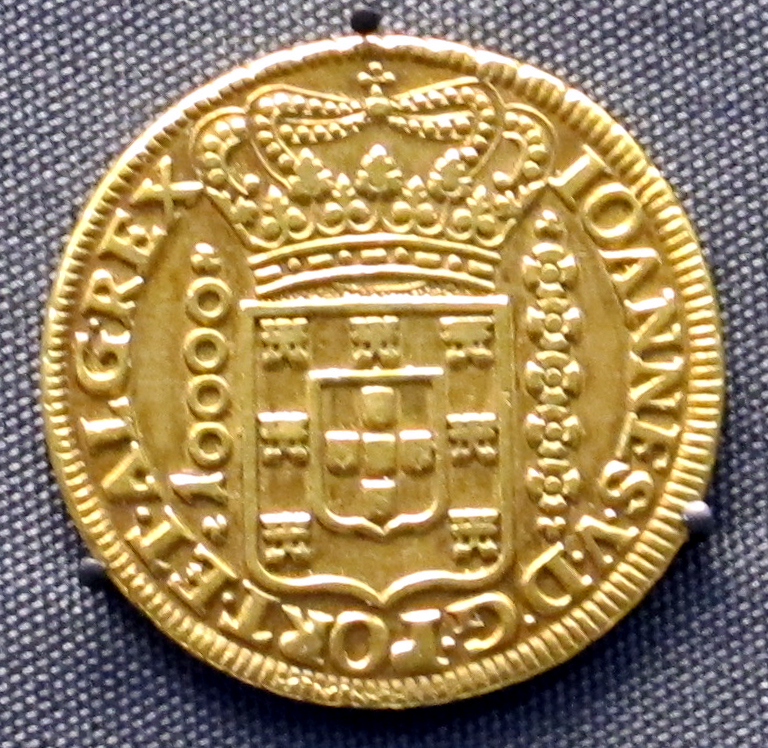
Portuguese colonial Brazil gold coin from the southeastern Brazilian state of Minas Gerais

Gold mining in Brazil has taken place continually in the Amazon since the 1690s, and has been important to the economies of Brazil and surrounding countries. In the late 17th century, amid the search for indigenous people to use in the slave trade, Portuguese colonists began to recognize the abundance of gold in the Amazon, triggering what would become the longest gold rush in history. This gold rush was also characterized as the first one in the modern century, making the region a very important step in gold mining around the world. The news of latent gold in Brazil (primarily in Minas Gerais) flooded the area with foreigners around 1693-1695. Despite the influx of money and political power this generated, it did not facilitate proper construction of mining institutions, therefore much of the collection was inefficient. Due to the already profitable agricultural operations taking place in the east, many Brazilians had been sent into the jungle as part of several agricultural reform programs. The methods and practices have changed in the following centuries and the work is often dangerous and detrimental to the surrounding ecosystems. Because artisanal mining is prohibited under federal law, the methods employed are often crude and unregulated, resulting in polluted water and massive deforestation.

More recently, partly due to the increasing price of gold, small-scale mining activity increased by 300% from 2000 to 2010. Illegal miners had been emboldened by the policies of former President Jair Bolsonaro, who opposed the protection of indigenous populations living in areas targeted for mining.

== History ==
In the 1690s, colonists known as Bandeirantes hunted the countryside (notably southeastern Colonial Brazil) for indigenous people to capture for the slave trade, and gold was discovered. The discovery changed the history of eastern South America, expanded the use of indigenous and African slaves in the Portuguese colonial regions of the continent, and contributed to the borders of present-day Brazil. Gold was found in the present-day state of Minas Gerais.

Unlike other gold rushes in the world's history, the Brazilian Gold Rush lasted the longest, from the 1690s into the 19th century. In contrast to the 1840s−1850s California Gold Rush, which helped the United States establish a new "Industrial Revolution" era infrastructure, the Brazilian gold rush saw mass migration but little new non-mining infrastructure in the colony. Much like other gold rushes around the world of the era, the natural resources received notable environmental degradation from the mining process. What sets the Brazilian gold rush apart is that the consequences of losing environmentally crucial resources did not hinder the mining of gold.

Between 1693 and 1720, some 400,000 Portuguese and 500,000 slaves relocated to southeastern Brazil to mine gold. Such was the growth that, by 1725, half of Brazil's entire population was residing in Minas Gerais. The excitement of the thought of instant wealth brought many people to the mines. The Brazilian Gold Rush also provided a new excuse for slavery to thrive as thousands upon thousands were forced to do the work, while the slave/mine owners prospered.

The Gongo Soco gold mine, operated by the Imperial Brazilian Mining Association of Cornwall using skilled Cornish miners and unskilled slaves, produced over 12,000 kilograms (26,000 lb) of gold between 1826 and 1856. The initial Brazilian Gold Rush lasted until the late 1800s. Present-day village residents known as garimpeiros still try to make a living from gold mining.

== Brazil's modern illicit gold mining industry ==
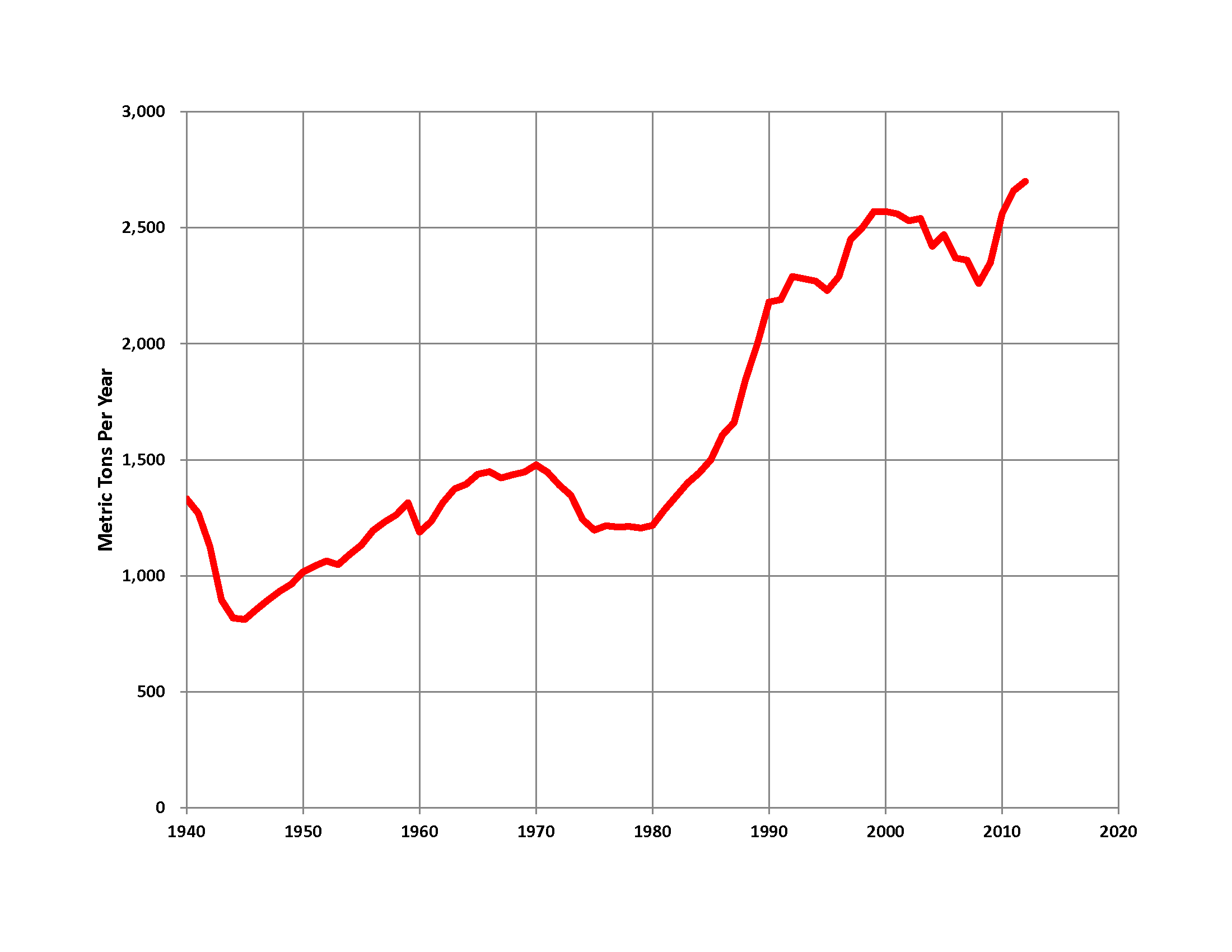
World production graph is synonymous with the growing global demand for gold.

The Amazon rainforest is widely recognized as being of great environmental and economic value for local communities and the world at large. However, human activities which contribute to its rapid deforestation persist. Brazil's illicit gold mining industry began to fully blossom in the 1950s, consequently making the Amazon a focal point for the Brazilian Government. Up until this point, the traditional means of accessing the Amazon were via waterways. However, while this somewhat sufficient for exploratory purposes, if the government were to extract resources in abundance, then it would need a more convenient means of access. The solution was to build a network of roads and highways penetrating the forest, thus allowing not only mass settlement in the region, but also the opportunity to extract resources quickly and effectively. This was also seen as a way to prevent further migration in the south of Brazil, because highly successful agricultural operations were already underway and the government wanted to avoid any conflict between farmers in the region.

Management of the rainforest's resources began to take shape with Brazil's Agrarian Reform Program. The program, established in the 1970s, has since trans-located approximately 1.2 million settlers, mostly into Amazonian hinterlands. Available records indicate that between 1995 and 2011, 1,235,130 families had been trans-located into 8865 settlement projects, those of which account for roughly 10.3% of Brazil's territory. Though only 13% of those families have been relocated to Amazonia, this program has still been heavily taxing on the Amazon. This is due, in large part, to the lackluster enforcement of environmental regulations by the government. Though Brazil's Ministry of Agrarian Development presides over the land allocations and regulations that stipulate the rules landowners must adhere to, they fail in ensuring cooperation. For example, in an assessment from 1985 to 2001, of 4,340 agrarian settlement projects, only 43% retained the mandated environmental buffer established by the ministry. Also, Brazilian Amazonia reported the highest rates of illegal timber extraction. This resulted in a situation in which the Brazilian Environmental Agency (Instituto Brasileiro do Meio Ambiente e dos Recursos Naturais Renováveis—IBAMA) repeatedly fined the federal agrarian agency (Instituto Nacional de Colonização e Reforma Agrária—INCRA). Thus, there ensues a case in which government agencies that preside in overlapping jurisdictions fail to clearly define multilateral policy objectives, which ultimately produces inefficiencies.

When this rural-rural migration took place, the land that the migrants were allotted was often infertile. Once they found that the land they were allowed to farm on was not yielding consistently, they saw the need to make use of the entirety of their allotment, thus leading to the deforestation of the required riparian buffers. However, even after having made use of the entire plot, they did not realize any substantial production. It is this series of events that has led many to resort to illegal mining.

Gold mining is explicitly illegal in the Amazon according to official federal mandates, however, it persists due to the lack of government oversight described earlier. Another big part of why the government isn't able to enforce policies on the artisanal mines however is because they cannot find the, since a lot of them are located in remote areas in the jungle. One maneuver that gold prospectors have been employing is to pay local village leaders to 'guide' them through the local forests. Because the government does a poor job of patrolling the forest, the local chiefs are the informal gatekeepers and can essentially control who has permission to mine. This dynamic is a newer emergence, however. After the initial Amazonian development boom took place in the 1970s, many of the indigenous Amazonian tribes took action against the exploitation of the forest. These efforts largely took place in the 80s and achieved marked success. Among the victories that local people enjoyed was a greater emphasis on the conservation of the forest itself and the limitation of mining. Many developers took little issue with the limitation of mining practices because, at the time, the price of gold did not render it worth the hassle. In the early 21st century, the price increased greatly, thus making the risk worth the potential reward. Not only does mining, in general, contribute to deforestation, but the crude methods used in 'wildcat mining', specifically, poison the ground and surrounding water supplies.

However, while the market for gold in the Amazon is technically an illicit act, those who mine in the Amazon are simply meeting a real global demand. The global demand for gold rose in 2019 to 2,351 tonnes following increases from, among others, China and India. Additionally, gold accumulation by official sectors rose 75% in 2018.

== Present-day miners and culture ==
Brazilian miners, garimpeiros, came from all walks of life and corners of the country out to the Amazon rainforest to mine for gold. These men, much like the 49ers in California, ventured out on their own and mined the jungle without interference from the government or any other entity. Makeshift towns and enterprising people followed these men into the jungle. "In all Garimpos there is a considerable floating population of non-garimpieros supplying goods and services; cooks, male and female prostitutes, mechanics, mule drivers, gold buyers, police troopers, traders, pilots, doctors, dentists, entertainers, photographers, and others". The culture that surrounds these camps is, on one hand, a brotherhood where every miner looks out for one another, however, on the other hand, it seems that it is survival of the fittest. "Life inside Garimpos is wild and anarchic. It sees other garimpieros as competitors rather than comrades. Gold is seen as fundamentally corrupting. It ignites greed and amorality in people who seem, and may even once have been, honest and likable". These makeshift pop-up towns seemed to resemble those of the Wild West in America, where the law was scarce, and a sense of social Darwinism was established. These artisanal miners have been able to get more than 800 tons of alluvial gold using their outdated and simple methods, making their gold rush the largest of the modern century, since they have found the amount of gold equivalent to 200 years of mining in central Brazil and 100 years of mining in California as well.

== Social impact ==
Case studies that concentrate on the social aspect of artisanal small-scale mining have found that due to their lack of education the garimpeiros cannot get into other lines of legal work, making them dependent on this line of extractivist and harmful work. Their living conditions are also not ideal, since these operations are deep in the Amazon forest they have little access to emergency services and other services like pharmacies, this means that the spread of diseases is very prominent, due to the environment, and can even be deadly, since they are far away from any places that could help. In a lot of small scale mining operations there have also been a lot of instances of forced labor and modern day slavery; which is defined as forced labor, which is enforced by violence and long working hours, since it violates the workers rights and includes degrading working conditions and restriction of workers to move around. Since these operations are illegal and sometimes untraceable they are able to get away with things like abuse, forced labor, bonded labor and more instances that can be discussed as and seen in the light of modern slavery. There was a study of the sediment in the Conceição River Basin, where gold and iron ore are located. It was also found that the central area of the river basin where the gold miners are located was the part of the basin that had the most pollution, as well as the lower part where the iron ore mines are located as well. It was also found that these two areas are the ones that pose the most ecological risk due to the concentration of metals, specifically mercury, that they have found there.The pollution of the ecosystem and waterways has a lot of negative effects on wildlife, some of which are reproductive, behavioral and to the nervous systems. This can later reach humans, since a lot of the animals affected are food sources for humans who live in communities close to the mining operations, this pollution, specifically that of mercury, when it enters the human body it can affect things like visual disturbances, psychiatric disorders and more.

Another social impact that small scale operations bring to the amazons is conflicts, specifically with the indigenous community that populate the amazons. Tensions tend to run high when a lot of people immigrate to the area for the gold mines and for the new discovered deposits, which can impact the cultural practices of the indigenous groups and their way of life. This is due to the fact that these mining operations normally bring with them a lot of people and violent practices, like prostitution and alcohol.

== Environmental impact ==
While the promise of wealth brings in the garimpeiros, they themselves bring about the destruction of the ecosystem. From the beginning up until the present day, miners are still looking for a profit. The difference is that today's technology vastly accelerates the mining process in the jungle, meaning that it is affecting double or triple the amount of land as before. The recent popularity surge of gold mining is due to the unstable global economy over the past two decades. The price of gold has nearly tripled in that time. "Researchers from the University of Puerto Rico have shown that between 2001 and 2013, around 1,680 square kilometres (650 sq mi) of tropical forest was lost in South America as a result of gold mining, which increased from around 377 square kilometres (146 sq mi) to 1,303 square kilometres (503 sq mi) since the global economic crisis in 2007".

Gold mining in the Amazon rainforest has destroyed whole state-sized chunks of the rainforest. However, the destruction is not simply kept to where the mining occurs. Mercury is used to purify gold in the Amazon. Unfortunately, this toxic element has been reported downstream as poisoning the fish that fishermen catch and sell in the markets. This technique of separation, called amalgamation, is done without protective equipment and without any regulations to dispose of the mercury safely. There is also no real measurements used when the mercury is added, the amount of mercury added to the batch is based on how much gold is thought to be in the mixer, the more gold they think they have the more mercury is added. The main loss happens when the mercury is mixed in, where it gets grounded to fine particle and becomes more soluble. Therefore, a massive amount of mercury has been flowing down the Amazon River since it first made its way through the hands of the miners. Artisanal gold mining operations, also known as Garimpos, are the main operations that still use mercury in the process of amalgamation, when purifying gold. According to the University of Idaho, it is believed that gold mining contributes to approximately 80% (168 tons annually) of mercury contamination. Globally small scale artisanal operations are the cause of most of these emissions, it is also responsible for around 2/3 of the anthropogenic mercury in our oceans. It has been estimated that around 35% of mercury lost during the amalgamation process enters the waterways, while the rest is emitted directly into the atmosphere. Mercury has devastating effects on wildlife and ultimately on the people who ingest this deadly poison. It can harm a pregnant mother's fetus, resulting in abnormal growth/malformation of the baby's central nervous system. The two main sources of mercury contamination are the fish that these communities consume and how close to mining the individual is, and more importantly, the exposure to amalgamation. A big reason why the small-scale mining industry is both so demanding on physical labor and so inefficient and harmful to the environment is because of the inefficient extraction methods, which make it so that more work needs to be put into the extraction while not that much gold is found. A lot of these operations are illegal and small this means that they are limited to the techniques and machines that they can use, not only this but a lot of these machineries are expensive, which would drive up their costs for gold, not aligning with the cheap labor wanted from the extraction.

Open pit mining in artisanal operations has also been a big source of heavy metals pollution in the area, since they are exposing those heavily concentrated patches of naturally occurring heavy metals and bringing them up to the surface, and therefore contaminating the soil and the surrounding area. In the case of the Serra Pelada open pit, a village was built near the affected area once the pit was closed down, where later the villagers planted crops, which was found to be polluted with heavy metals due to the concentration in the soil, which was tested along with other samples of soil to measure the effects of open pit mining operations.

There are often harmful, societal by-products that mining has brought to communities near various operations. Among such byproducts are prostitution, drugs, alcohol abuse, and violence. For example, in 2017, the New York Times reported that 10 members of an 'uncontacted' Amazonian tribe had been murdered by gold miners near the Columbia border. Another negative aspect of mining is that it renders the land essentially useless for further use. Most of the mining that takes place in the Amazon is done via the aforementioned process known as 'wildcat mining', in which miners essentially try their luck in different locations without sophisticated surveying technology. This results in a gritty operation through the use of hazardous technology such as explosive fertilizer and mercury, which ensures the capture of even the smallest pieces of gold. This poisons and degrades the surrounding soil and can pollute water sources up to one hundred miles away. Regarding the economy of illicit gold mining in particular, another issue is that the lack of regulation inhibits the government from being able to take in any taxes from mining activities.

The Amazon is an essential part of the Earth's ecosystem. It is widely known that it is the world's largest carbon sink, however, if it were to reach approximately 20-25% deforestation, this could be the tipping point at which it would no longer be a buffer against atmospheric carbon dioxide build-up. The Brazilian government estimates the current deforestation level to be 19.3%. Also, the Amazon is responsible for about 16% of all oxygen produced on land, regulating weather patterns, and mitigating climate change.

== Gold mining resurgence ==
Many experts have speculated that ever since the global economy took a crash over 2 decades ago, gold's worth has been on the rise ever since. "The price of gold, which stood at $271 an ounce on September 10, 2001, hit $1,023 in March 2008, and it may surpass that threshold again. Gold's recent surge, sparked in part by the terrorist attack on 9/11, has been amplified by the slide of the U.S. dollar and jitters over a looming global recession". This jump in gold prices was especially drastic in 2005 when the price continued to climb every year at a rate of nearly 200 dollars per year, which previously took over 160 years to achieve. This spike in price is an ominous warning to the global economy. However, this would explain why deforestation rates during the same period have reached an all-time high. Gold mining over the past five years in the Amazon however has taken a hit due to the unpopularity of gold.

== See also ==
- Brazilian Gold Rush
- Gold mines in Brazil
- Gold mining in Brazil
- History of mining in Brazil
