= Adonias Filho =

Brazilian novelist, essayist, journalist, and literary critic (1915–1990)

Adonias Aguiar Filho
- Filho in 1967, from the collection of the Brazilian National Archives
- Born: November 27, 1915; Itajuípe, Brazil
- Died: August 2, 1990 (aged 74); Ilheus, Bahia, Brazil
- Organization: Academia Brasileira de Letras

Adonias Aguiar Filho (November 27, 1915 – August 2, 1990) was a novelist, essayist, journalist, and literary critic from Bahia, Brazil, and a member of the Academia Brasileira de Letras.

== Life ==
Filho was born in Itajuípe, Brazil, the son of Adonias Aguiar and Rachel Bastos de Aguiar.

In 1936, 2 years after finishing high school in Salvador, he moved from the south of Bahia to Rio de Janeiro, Brazil’s capital at the time, where he continued his career in Journalism, previously started in Salvador. He worked for well known newspapers such as Correio da Manhã and Revista do Brazil. He was also a literary critic for Cadernos da "Hora Presente", from São Paulo in 1937, A Manhã, from 1944 to 1945, along with Jornal de Letras (from 1955 to 1960) and Diário de Notícias (from 1958 to 1960). In São Paulo, he also collaborated with O Estado de S. Paulo and Folha da Manhã.

Between 1946 and 1950, he ran the book publishing company "A Noite". He was the director of the Serviço Nacional de Teatro, in 1954, and director of the Biblioteca Nacional from 1961 to 1971. At the same time, he worked for the Agência Nacional at the Ministério da Justiça.

In 1966, he was elected vice-president of the Associação Brasileira de Imprensa (ABI) and in the following year, he became a member of the Conselho Federal de Cultura (CFC). He was re-elected in 1969, 1971 and 1973. He was the president of the ABI in 1972 and president of the CFC from 1977 to 1990, when he died.

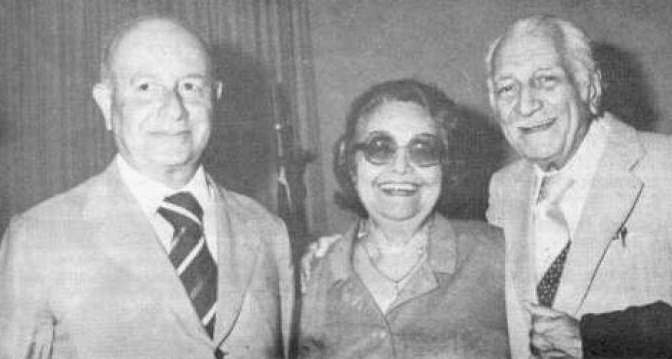
Adonias Filho (on the left) with friends, Brazilian writers Rachel de Queiroz (center), and Gilberto Freyre (right).

As a writer, Adonias Aguiar Filho searched for inspiration for his fiction in the "zona cacaueira" (Cocoa plantations) close to Ilhéus, back to his origins in the South of Bahia, where he was born and raised. This ambiance is well displayed in his first novel, Os servos da morte (The Servants of Death), published in 1946. In the form of the romance novel, reality served as an opportunity to recreate a world charged with symbolism, in the situations as well as in the characters, bearing witness to a tragic sense of life and worldview. For his depiction of the characters' inner struggles, he was called by critics "the Brazilian Dostoevsky".

He was part of the Grupo Festa, a literary society devoted to spirituality and Catholic tradition.

The use of original stylistic features, reflective of the internal violence of his characters gave him a fundamental place in the literary generation that created the third phase of Brazilian Modernism in 1945, which was based on a return to more normal disciplines of writing. They were concerned about writing with less formal research, while broadening their regional meanings to apply universally. Their work still has a significant influence on contemporary Brazilian literature and fiction.

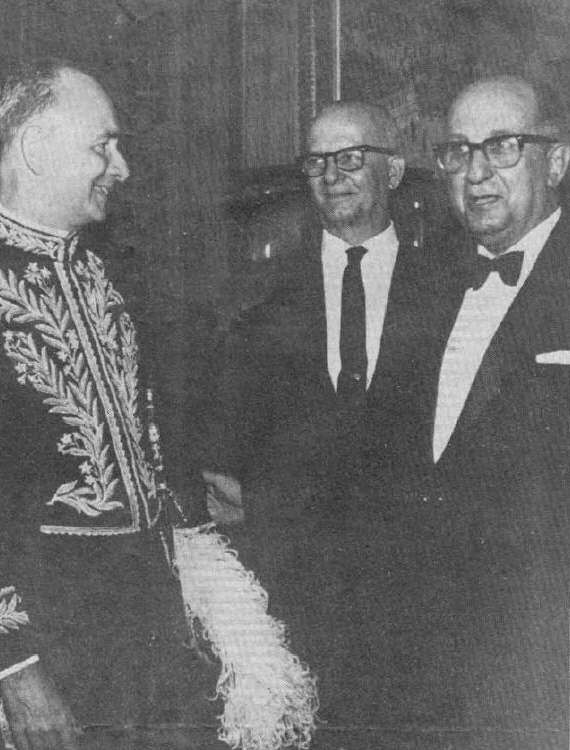
Photo of Adonias Filho (left) being honored with the 21st chair of the Academia Brasileira de Letras, 1965

He was honored with the 21st chair at the Brazilian Academy of Letters (Academia Brasileira de Letras) at the age of 53, May 23, 1969. The title was handed to him by his fellow writer from Bahia, Jorge Amado. His literary work has been translated into English, German, Spanish, French and Slovak.

He died in Ilhéus, shortly after his wife did.

== Academia Brasileira de Letras ==
Fifth holder of the 21st Chair, originally held by Joaquim Serra; elected January 14, 1965.

Preceded by Álvaro Moreyra; Followed by Dias Gomes

== Bibliography ==
- Renascimento do homem - essay (1937)
- Tasso da Silveira e o tema da poesia eterna - essay (1940)
- Memórias de Lázaro - novel (1952)
- Jornal de um escritor (1954)
- Modernos ficcionistas brasileiros - essay (1958)
- Cornélio Pena - critique (1960)
- Corpo vivo - novel (1962)
- História da Bahia - essay (1963)
- O bloqueio cultural - essay (1964)
- O forte - novel (1965)
- Léguas da promissão - novella (1968)
- O romance brasileiro de crítica - critique (1969)
- Luanda Beira Bahia - novel (1971)
- O romance brasileiro de 30 - critique (1973)
- Uma nota de cem – children’s literature (1973)
- As velhas - novel (1975)
- Fora da pista - children’s literature (1978)
- O Largo da Palma - novella (1981)
- Auto de Ilhéus – theater (1981)
- Noites sem madrugada - novel (1983).
- O Homem de branco - novel (1987).

== Awards ==
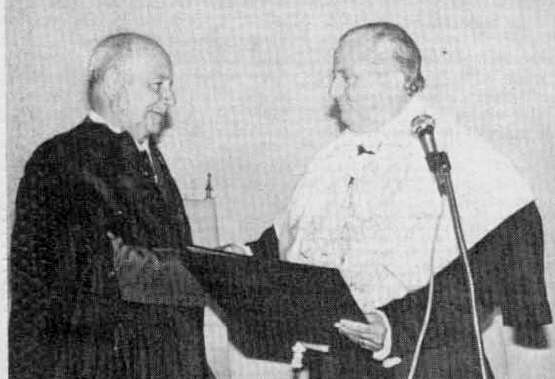
Receiving the title "Doctor Honoris Causa", 1983

Adonias Filho was awarded:

- Prêmio Paula Brito de crítica literária (Guanabara, 1968), for the book "Léguas da promissão",
- Golfinho de Ouro de Literatura (1968),
- Prêmio PEN Clube do Brasil,
- Prêmio da Fundação Educacional do Paraná (FUNDEPAR)
- Prêmio do Instituto Nacional do Livro (1968–1969)
- Prêmio Brasília de Literatura (1973), from Fundação Cultural do Distrito Federal.
- Premio Nacional de Literatura (1975), from Instituto Nacional do Livro, in the category published work (1974–1975), with the romance novel "As velhas", and
- Title of Doctor Honoris Causa by the Universidade Federal da Bahia, in 1983.
