= Brazilian gold rush =

1690s to late 19th century event

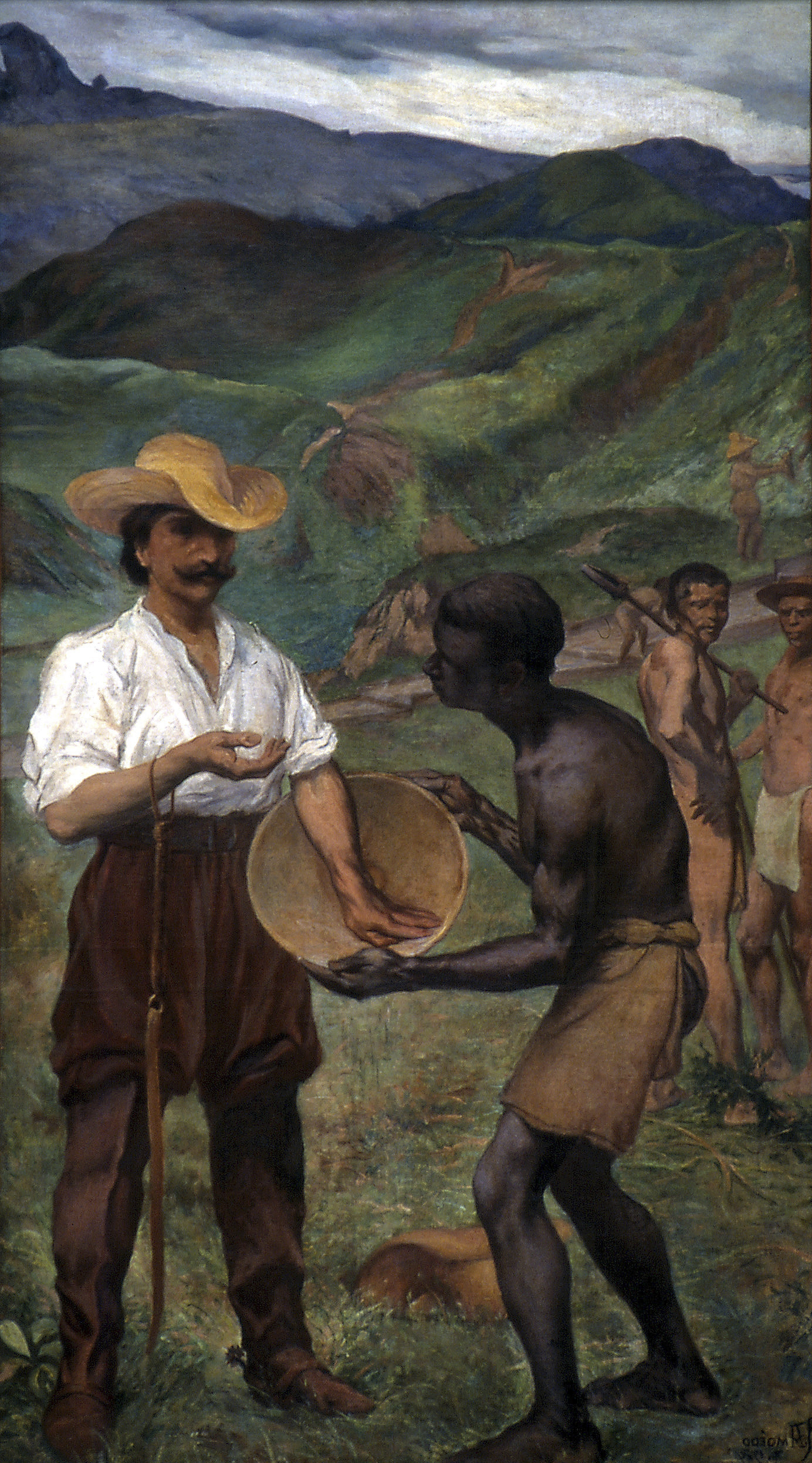
- Ciclo do Ouro (gold cycle), painting by Rodolfo Amoedo
- Date: Late 17th-late 19th century
- Location: Ouro Preto, captaincy of Minas Gerais, Colonial Brazil, Portuguese Empire, Amazon rainforest
- Cause: Gold discovered by the bandeirantes in the mountains of Minas Gerais
- Participants: 400,000 Portuguese miners Brazilian miners British miners Other European miners 500,000 African slaves
- Outcome: Created the world's longest gold rush period and the largest gold mines in South America

The Brazilian gold rush started in the 1690s in the Portuguese colony of Brazil and lasted until the late 19th century. The gold rush opened up the major gold-producing area of Ouro Preto (Portuguese for black gold), then known as Vila Rica. Eventually, the Brazilian gold rush created the world's longest gold rush period and the largest gold mines in South America.

== History ==
The gold rush began when bandeirantes discovered large gold deposits in the mountains of Minas Gerais. The bandeirantes were adventurers who organized themselves into small groups to explore the interior of Brazil. Many bandeirantes were of mixed indigenous and European background who adopted the ways of the natives, which permitted them to survive in the interior.

In 1695 at Rio das Velhas, Manuel Borba Gato discovered gold. In 1698, Vila Rica (later Ouro Preto) was established, becoming the capital of Minas Gerais from 1720 to 1897. In 1697, the Estrada Real was established by the crown to promote development of the interior, reaching from the coast through Ouro Preto onwards to Diamantina. The Portuguese colonial government initially viewed the gold rush with trepidation, as they had concerns it would displace Brazilian agriculture and that the Portuguese would not be fully able to control the gold production.

More than 400,000 Portuguese and 500,000 African slaves came to the gold region to mine. Many people abandoned the sugar plantations and towns in the northeast coast to migrate to the gold region. By 1725, half the population of Brazil was living in the southeast.

Officially, 800 metric tons of gold were sent to Portugal in the 18th century. Other gold circulated illegally, and still other gold remained in the colony to adorn churches and for other uses. The municipality of Ouro Preto became the most populous city of Latin America, counting on about 40,000 people in 1730 and up to 80,000 by the end of the 18th century.

Minas Gerais was the gold mining center of Brazil. Slave labor was generally used for the workforce. The discovery of gold in the area caused a huge influx of European immigrants, and the government decided to bring in bureaucrats from Portugal to control operations. They set up numerous bureaucracies, often with conflicting duties and jurisdictions. The officials were generally incapable of controlling this highly lucrative industry.

In 1830, the Saint John d'El Rey Mining Company, controlled by the British, opened the largest gold mine in Latin America. The British brought in modern management techniques and engineering expertise. Located in Nova Lima, the mine extracted ore for 125 years.

== Cuiabá gold rush ==
In 1718 or 1719 gold was found on the Cuiabá River. This was about 1,400 km northwest of São Paulo and Ouro Preto across mostly uncolonized country. The lasting effect of the gold rush was to extend a finger of Portuguese settlement northwest from São Paulo to the current Bolivian border.

The discoverers were bandeirantes Pascoal Moreira Cabral Leme and Antonio Pires de Campos. Miguel Sutil found half an arroba of gold in one day near the present town of Cuiabá. The area soon had a population of 7,000 including 2,600 slaves and was producing 400 arrobas of gold per month. Bom Jusus de Cuiabá was founded 1727. Prices were enormous due to the long distance.

In 1728, when chests of Cuiabá gold were opened in Lisbon, they were found to contain lead instead. The culprits were never found. The deposits soon played out, and by 1737 there were only 7 white men and a few slaves in Cuiabá town.

The 3,500-km route to the gold fields ran 155 km overland from São Paulo to Porto Feliz, down the Tietê River and Paraná River, up the Rio Pardo, 13-km portage at Camapuã, down the Coxim and Taquari River through the Pantanal swamps, and up the Paraguay and Cuiabá. There were around 100 rapids. The route was just north of the ‘vacaria’ of cow country. The outbound journey, loaded with passengers and freight, started during high water from March to June and took from five to seven months. The return journey, loaded with gold, took a few months. The 1726 convoy had 305 canoes and over 3,000 people. These convoys were called ‘monsoons’ (pt:Monções (expedições fluviais)).

In addition to rapids and mosquitoes, there were also Indians. The 1720 convoy was wiped out by unknown persons. In 1725 the Payaguá (a canoe people on the Paraguay) annihilated a convoy with only two escaping. In 1728 they attacked some bandeirantes and liberated their Paraesi captives. In 1730 they killed 400 people and captured 60 arrobas of gold. They did not understand its value. One Spaniard traded a tin plate for six pounds of gold. Some survivors of the 1730 raid walked overland to Camapuã. A 1733 convoy had only four survivors. Punitive expeditions failed until 1734 when an 842-man force destroyed a Payagua town. In 1735 they killed all but four of a convoy. Attacks declined as the gold ran out and because the Payagua quarreled with their Guayacuru or Mbayá neighbors.

== See also ==
- Brazilian Gold
- Estrada Real
- Gold mining in Brazil
- Chilean silver rush
- Tierra del Fuego Gold Rush
- Brazilian sugar cycle
- Brazilian cotton cycle
