= Jorge Medauar =

Brazilian poet and writer

Jorge Emílio Medauar (1918–2003) was a Brazilian poet and writer. He was born in 1918 in the village of Água Preta do Mucambo, currently a municipality in Uruçuca, in the southern region of Bahia. His parents, Emílio Medauar and Maria Zaidan Medauar, were Syrian Arab immigrants. When still young, he moved to São Simão, in the interior of São Paulo with his family. His career as a writer, journalist and publicist began in Rio de Janeiro in 1945. Initially, he worked in two magazines linked to the Brazilian Communist Party (PCB), as secretary at Literatura (1946–1948) and editor at Fundamentos (1948–1955).

During this period, Brazil was going through a period of democratic revival after the dictatorship of the Estado Novo led by Getúlio Vargas. The coup of 1964 led to renewed military rule, and Medauar received threats due to his activism. In São Paulo, he worked in colleges, newspapers, magazines and advertising agencies. He founded the São Paulo School of Advertising and Marketing (ESPM) where he served as director and teacher. It was in São Paulo that he spent most of his life, dying on June 3, 2003.

He also served as secretary, director, collaborator, advisor, among others, in several newspapers such as O Estado de São Paulo, A Tarde (Salvador) and O Globo. As a writer, he represented UBE (União Brasileira de Escritores) in Rio de Janeiro and São Paulo and was a member of the Academies of Letters of Ilhéus and the Academy of Child and Youth Literature of São Paulo. He had extensive relationships in artistic and intellectual circles, counting among his peers writers such as Manuel Bandeira, Guimarães Rosa, João Cabral de Melo Neto, Carlos Drummond de Andrade, Graciliano Ramos and Jorge Amado.

== Works ==
=== Poetry ===
- Chuva sobre a tua semente (1945);
- Morada de paz (1949);
- Prelúdios noturnos e tema de amor (1954);
- Fluxograma (1959)
- Jogo chinês (1962),
- À estrela e aos bichos (1956).

=== Stories ===
- Água Preta (1958), prêmio Jabuti da Câmara Brasileira do Livro;
- 2 contos de festas, com Ricardo Ramos (1958);
- A procissão e os porcos (1960);
- Histórias de menino (1961);
- O incêndio (1963), prêmio Governador do Estado de São Paulo;
- O dinheiro do caju – O cigano (1963),
- Jorge Medauar conta estórias de Água Preta (1975);
- No dia em que os peixes pescaram os homens (1978);
- Bom como diabo (1982);
- Visgo da terra (1983);
- Contos encantados (1985),
- Viventes de Água Preta (1996).

=== Criticism ===
- Ensaios (2000)
