= Brazilian sugar cycle =

Period of Brazilian colonial history

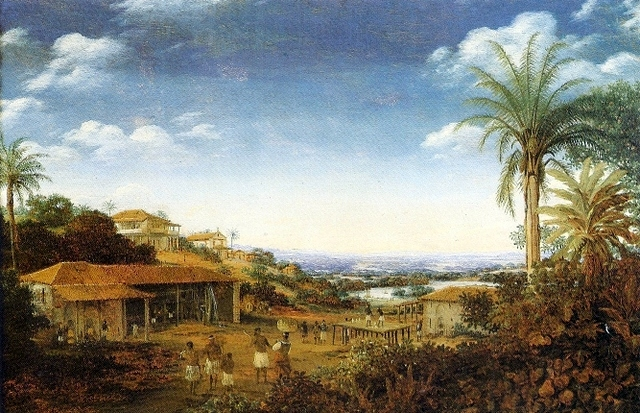
A sugar mill in colonial Pernambuco, by Dutch painter Frans Post (17th century).

The Brazilian sugar cycle, also referred to as the sugar boom or sugarcane cycle, was a period in the history of colonial Brazil from the mid-16th century to the mid-18th century. Sugar represented Brazil's first great agricultural and industrial wealth and, for a long time, was the basis of the colonial economy.

The cycle began in 1530, when sugarcane was introduced on the island of Itamaracá, off the coast of Pernambuco, by the colonial administrator Pero Capico. With the creation of the hereditary captaincies, Pernambuco and São Vicente rose to prominence in sugar production, the latter being overtaken by Bahia after the establishment of the general government. In 1549, Pernambuco already had thirty sugar mills; Bahia, eighteen; and São Vicente, two. Sugarcane farming was prosperous and, half a century later, the distribution of the engenhos totaled 256.

The production was based on the plantation system in which large farms were producing a single product. Their production was geared toward foreign trade and used slave labor composed of natives and Africans – whose trafficking also generated profits. The most productive sugar mills used African labor, while the smaller mills continued with the original indigenous labor.

The senhor de engenho was a farmer who owned the sugar production unit. The main destination of Brazilian sugar was the European market. Besides sugar, the production of tobacco and cotton also stood out in Brazil at that time.

Pernambuco, the richest of the captaincies during the sugarcane cycle, had impressed Father Fernão Cardim, who was surprised by "the farms larger and richer than those of Bahia, the banquets of extraordinary delicacies, the beds of crimson damask, fringed with gold and the rich bedspreads from India", and summarized his impressions in an anthological phrase: "Finally, in Pernambuco, one finds more vanity than in Lisbon". Pernambuco's opulence seemed to derive, as Gabriel Soares de Sousa suggests in 1587, from the fact that at that time the captaincy was "so powerful (...) that there are more than one hundred men in it that have from one thousand to five thousand cruzados of income, and some of eight, ten thousand cruzados. From this land, many rich men came to these very poor kingdoms". By the early 17th century, Pernambuco was the largest and richest sugar-producing area in the world.

== History ==
=== Context ===
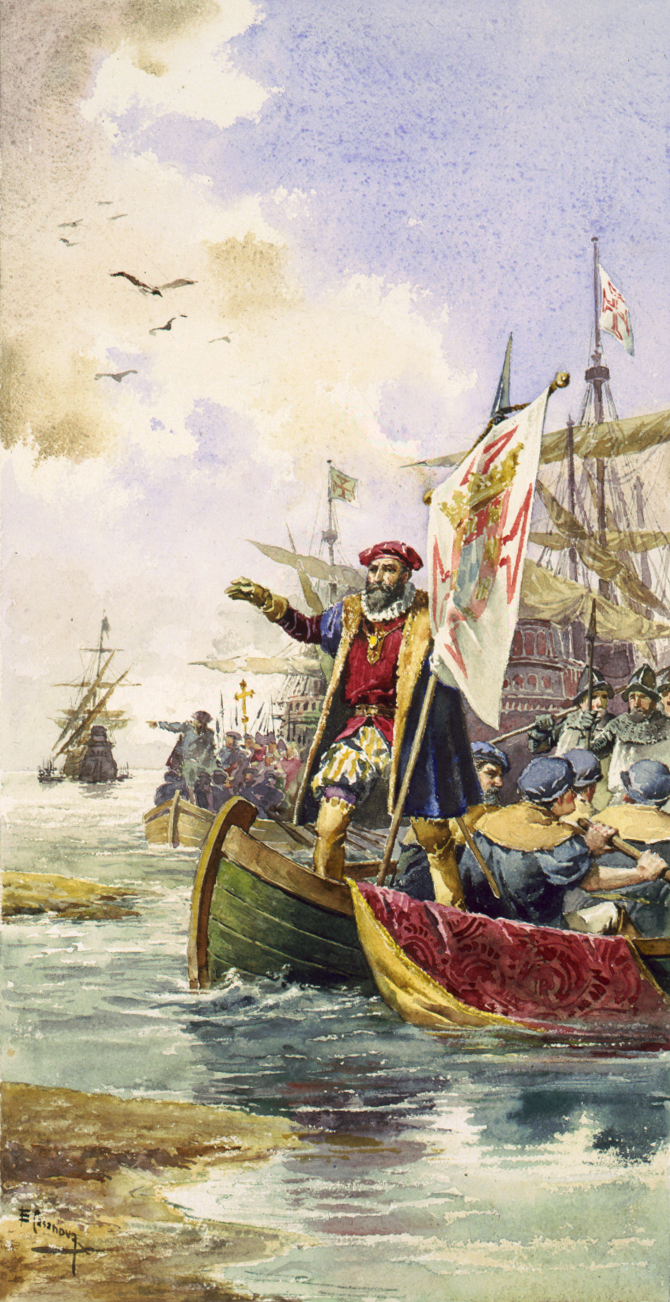
Vasco da Gama arrives in Calicut, India, on May 20, 1498. The new route caused a drop in spice prices.

In 1498, the Portuguese navigator Vasco da Gama discovered a sea route to the Indies, which would allow the Portuguese to trade spices without the mediation of the Arabs and the Venetians, who had a monopoly on trade in the Mediterranean Sea. As an immediate consequence, there was a drop in the prices of spices.

The discovery of gold in Spanish America aroused great interest in Portugal's newly discovered lands in Brazil. But it also attracted the interest of the Netherlands, France, and England, which questioned the Treaty of Tordesillas, in which they did not participate. They declared that they only recognized the ownership of populated lands. In order not to lose its lands, Portugal would have to occupy them, a task that demanded many resources. Without finding gold, they needed to develop an economic activity to offset the costs of this occupation.

Agricultural production proved unviable. Wheat was grown in Europe, and freight from America was very expensive. Only spices and manufactured goods were viable options.

=== Success factors ===
The Portuguese already had experience, for several decades, exploring sugar on the Atlantic islands (Madeira Island, Azores, Cape Verde, and São Tomé and Príncipe). The country already dominated the sugar mill equipment industry.

The offer of the still relatively new product in Europe by the Italian cities trained consumers, which did not prevent a crisis of low prices in 1496, redirecting a large part of the production to the Flemish ports. By the mid-16th century, this agricultural enterprise had become a joint Portuguese and Flemish venture. This association was vital to absorb the large Brazilian production that entered the market from the second half of the 16th century on. There is evidence that powerful Dutch groups also financed the production facilities in Brazil and the transport of slave labor. It should also be noted that by this time the Portuguese were fully aware of the workings of the African slave market, having begun war operations to capture pagan blacks a century earlier, in the time of Dom Henrique.

Brazil was the largest producer of sugar in the world in the 16th and 17th centuries. The main sugar-producing regions were at first Pernambuco, Bahia, São Paulo and Rio de Janeiro. Later on, Paraíba also joined this select group, and by the time of the Dutch Invasions, it had almost two dozen sugar mills.

The Colonial Pact imposed by Portugal established that Brazil (Colony) could only trade with the Metropolis, and should not compete with products produced there. Therefore, Brazil could not produce anything that the Metropolis already produced. A trade monopoly was established, in a way imposed by the British government on Portugal, in order to guarantee a market for English merchants. The colony sold metals, tropical, and subtropical products at low prices set by the Metropolis, and bought manufactured goods and slaves from it at much higher prices, thus ensuring Portugal's profit in either transaction.

== Historical-Sociological Evaluation ==
In the words of Gilberto Freyre:

The richness of the soil was profound: The generations of engenho lords could succeed each other in the same engenho; become stronger; put down roots in stone-and-lime houses; there was no need for the agrarian nomadism that was practiced in other lands, where the soil was less fertile, soon exhausted by monoculture, making the farmer almost always a gypsy in search of virgin land. (...) The quality of the soil, complemented by that of the atmosphere, conditioned, as perhaps no other element, that regional specialization of the colonization of America by the Portuguese, based on sugar cane (...). The truth is that it was in the extreme Northeast - by extreme Northeast one must understand the stretch of the agrarian region of the North that goes from Sergipe to Ceará - and in the Recôncavo Baiano - in its best soil of clay and humus - that the traces, the values, the Portuguese traditions were first established and took on a Brazilian physiognomy. The most Brazilian because of its type of aristocrat, today in decadence, and mainly because of its type of man of the people, already close, perhaps, to relative stability. A man of the people [...] made of three bloods, in other lands so inimical - that of the white, the Indian and the black. A black man adapted like no other to sugar farming and the tropical climate. A Portuguese also willing to settle down in agriculture. An Indian who remained here more in the womb and breasts of the fat and loving cabocla than in the hands and feet of the restless and restless man.

== Bibliography ==
- Furtado, Celso (2000). Formação Econômica do Brasil. Folha da Manhã (under license of the Companhia Editora Nacional).
