= Alcibiades (disambiguation) =

Alcibiades or Alkibiades may refer to:

== In ancient Greece ==
- Alcibiades (c. 450–404 BC), a prominent Athenian statesman, orator, and general
  - Alcibiades (character), appearing in several Socratic dialogues
    - First Alcibiades, a dialogue attributed to Plato
    - Second Alcibiades, a dialogue attributed to Plato
- Alcibiades, the name of other members of the Alcmaeonidae family

== Other people ==
- Alcibiades of Apamea (fl. 230 AD), a Jewish Christian Elchesaite
- Albert Alcibiades, Margrave of Brandenburg-Kulmbach (1522–1557)
- Alcibíades Arosemena Quinzada (1883–1958), a Panamanian politician
- Alcibíades Colón Inoa (1919 – 2016), a Dominican Republic baseball player
- Alcibiades DeBlanc (1821–1883), an American lawyer
- Alcibiades Diamandi (1893–1948), an Aromanian political figure of Greece
- Alcibiades González Delvalle (born 1936), a Paraguayan writer
- Alcibiades Hidalgo (born 1946), Cuban politician and defector to the United States
- Alcibíades Rojas McRay (born 1986), a Panamanian footballer
- Alcibíades Vicencio (1860–1913), a Chilean obstetrician gynecologist and Scout
- Alkibiades Zickle, a pen-name of Willy Wiedmann (1929–2013)

== Other uses ==
- Alcibiades (horse) (1927–1957), racehorse
- Alcibiades Stakes, a horse race run annually in Lexington, Kentucky, U.S.
- Alcibiades the Schoolboy (1652), an Italian satirical defence of homosexuality in dialogue form

== See also ==
- Alcibiade (disambiguation)
