= Cultural depictions of Alcibiades =

Athenian general and statesman

The prominent Athenian statesman Alcibiades has been criticized by ancient comic writers and appears in several Socratic dialogues. He enjoys an important afterlife, in literature and art, having acquired symbolic status as the personification of ambition and sexual profligacy. He also appears in several significant works of modern literature.

== Ancient comedy ==
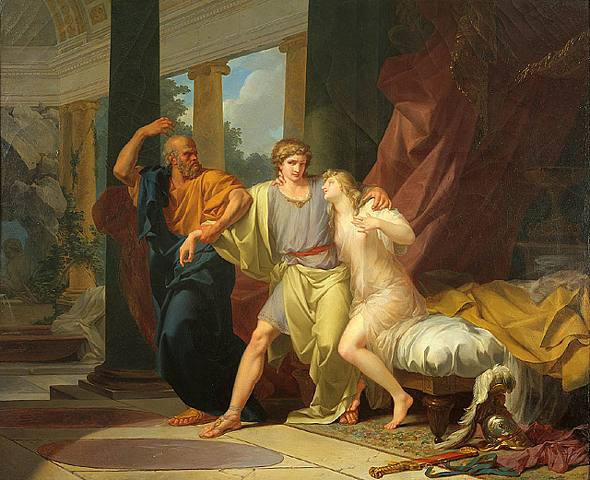
Jean-Baptiste Régnault (1754–1829): Socrates Tears Alcibiades from the Embrace of Sensual Pleasure, 1785

Alcibiades excited in his contemporaries a fear for the safety of the political order. Thereby, he has not been spared by ancient Greek comedy, and stories attest to an epic confrontation between Alcibiades and Eupolis resembling that between Aristophanes and Cleon.

Aristophanes mentions Alcibiades several times in his satirical plays, for instance making fun of his manner of speech and his lisp. According to Aristophanes the Athenian people "yearns for him, and hates him too, but wants him back". Aeschylus in Aristophanes' Frogs illustrates Alcibiades' ambivalent personality saying:

You should not rear a lion cub in the city,

[best not to rear a lion in the city,]

but if one is brought up, accommodate its ways.

Aeschylus sees Alcibiades as a powerful creation arousing admiration, but also as a "savage figure" unacceptable and dangerous when released in the city.

== Socratic dialogues ==
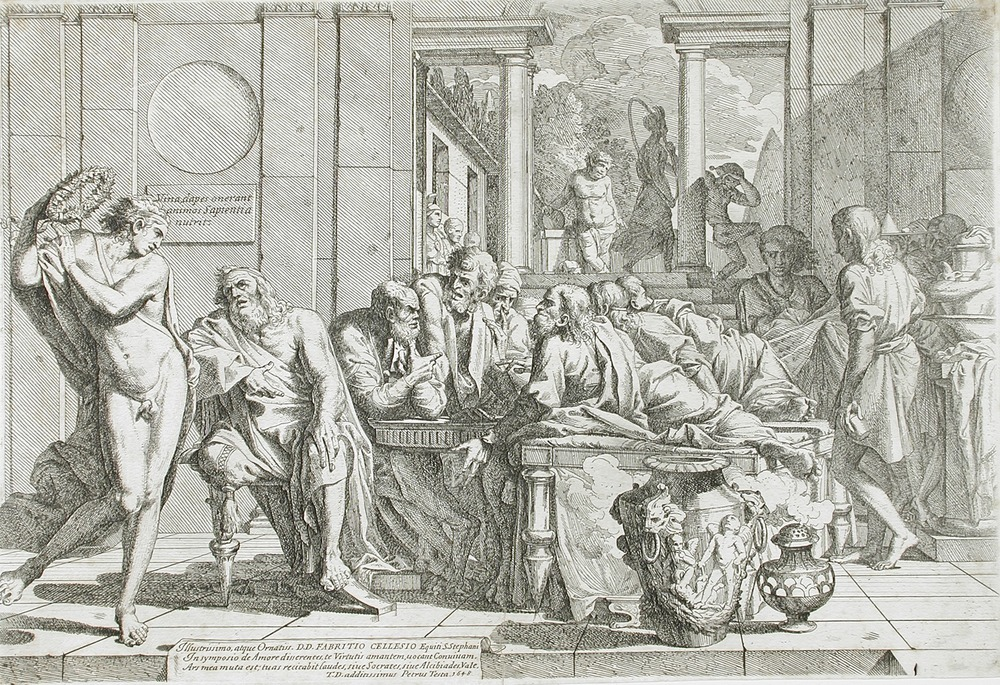
Pietro Testa (1611–1650): The Drunken Alcibiades Interrupting the Symposium (1648)

Alcibiades also appears in several Socratic dialogues:

- Plato's Symposium, where he claims to be in love with Socrates.
- There are two dialogues from antiquity titled "Alcibiades", ascribed to Plato, that feature Socrates in conversation with Alcibiades: First Alcibiades (or Alcibiades I) and Second Alcibiades (or Alcibiades II). These dialogues were considered to be genuine works of Plato by ancient authors, but their legitimacy was called into question in the 19th century by Friedrich Schleiermacher.

According to Plato, Alcibiades is an extraordinary soul, an embodiment of the pursuit of worldly power. What is extraordinary for the philosopher, however, is not the deeds that result but the soul itself, especially that selfish passion for what is best for himself beyond the conventional offices and honors. For Plato, Alcibiades embodies the culmination of politics, but that culmination that seeks a grand and almost god-like superiority that transcends politics. Plato presents Alcibiades as a youthful student and lover of Socrates who would, in time to come, be the ruin of Athens through his change of allegiance in war.[6] Because of the high level of esteem for the community in ancient Greece, Alcibiades’ betrayal of his fellow soldiers ensures that he is looked down upon in all of Plato's writings. He is indirectly ridiculed, often portrayed as intoxicated, boisterous, and seeking pleasure. According to Thomas Habinek, his appearance in Plato's Symposium conforms to the pattern of Alcibiades literature: Alcibiades is always just what is wanted: good looking, eloquent, witty, and easy to look down upon.

In his trial, Socrates must rebut the attempt to hold him guilty for the crimes of his former students, including Alcibiades, Critias and Charmides. Hence, he declares in Apology: "I have never been anyone's teacher", responding to quite concrete circumstances and recent events (mutilation of the hermai, betrayal of Athens by Alcibiades in the middle of the Peloponnesian War, regime of the Thirty Tyrants).

== Literature ==
In medieval and Renaissance works such as the Canterbury Tales, Erasmus's adage The Sileni of Alcibiades, Castiglione's Book of the Courtier, Rabelais's Gargantua and Pantagruel, Montaigne's Essays, Shakespeare's Timon of Athens, and Thomas Otway's tragedy Alcibiades, Alcibiades is presented as a military commander and student of Socratic teaching.

Alcibiades the Schoolboy, by Antonio Rocco (1652), has been called "the first homosexual novel".

Alcibiades constituted also a source of inspiration for certain modern novelists, especially those writing historical novels. In On the Knees of the Gods (1908), Anna Bowman Dodd covers Alcibiades' expedition against Sicily. The Jealous Gods (1928) of Gertrude Atherton is another novel about Alcibiades and ancient Athens. In Steven Pressfield's Tides of War, it was the character of Alcibiades who loomed most large over the narrative, just as he had the greatest impact on the Peloponnesian War. Undefeated during his career as a general and admiral, Alcibiades’ life played itself out like an epic tragedy with the tensions between his genius and the hubris that was his ultimate downfall. In Daniel Chavarría's novel, The Eye Of Cybele, a novel that fictionally recreates the behind-the-scenes scandals and political intrigues that occupied the Athenian home front at the height of the Peloponnesian War, Alcibiades is the central character and he is depicted as one of the Athens' most powerful generals and as a leading competitor for the favor of both Pericles and the masses. Alcibiades also appears in the satirical novel Picture This by Joseph Heller.

Other modern works featuring Alcibiades as a main character include:

- Machado de Assis' short story "Uma Visita de Alcebíades" (1875) is about Alcibiades showing up to a police officer in 19th century Brazil.
- Peter Green's Achilles His Armour (1955),
- Stephen Marlowe's Greek novel The Shining (1965)
- Rosemary Sutcliff's Flowers of Adonis (1969)
- Joel Richards' Nebula Award-nominated short story "The Gods Abandon Alcibiades" (Asimov's Science Fiction, February 2001) full text
- Paul Levinson's time travel novel, The Plot to Save Socrates (2006)
- Giannina Braschi's postcolonial novel United States of Banana (2011) features Alcibiades, Parmenides, Diotima, and Laches. Braschi's Spanglish novel Yo-Yo Boing! (1998) features Alcebíades gossiping about Socrates.
- Ilja Leonard Pfeijffer's novel Alkibiades (2023)

== Art ==
Alcibiades has been depicted regularly in art, both in Medieval and Renaissance works.

== Other media ==
Alcibiades is a role in Erik Satie's Socrate (1918), a work for voice and small orchestra (or piano). (The text is composed of excerpts of Victor Cousin's translation of works by Plato, with all of the chosen texts referring to Socrates.)

Alcibiades appears as a prominent recurring character in the 2018 video game Assassin's Creed Odyssey, which takes place in ancient Greek times at the start of the Peloponnesian War. In the game, Alcibiades gives the protagonist several quests, and is also an optional romance option for sexual encounters. True to his historic nature, many of his quests have hidden motivations that assist him in gaining financial and political power, however he is depicted positively, siding with the main characters against the game's antagonists.

Alcibiades appears in the first season of the webcomic Everywhere & Nowhere in a main capacity.
