= Gaetano Capone =

Italian painter

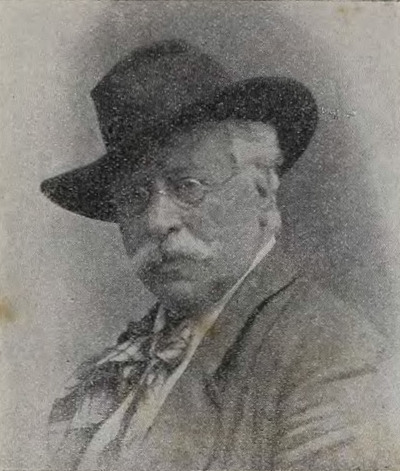
- Born: 10 July 1845
- Died: 6 August 1924 (aged 79)
- Occupation: Painter

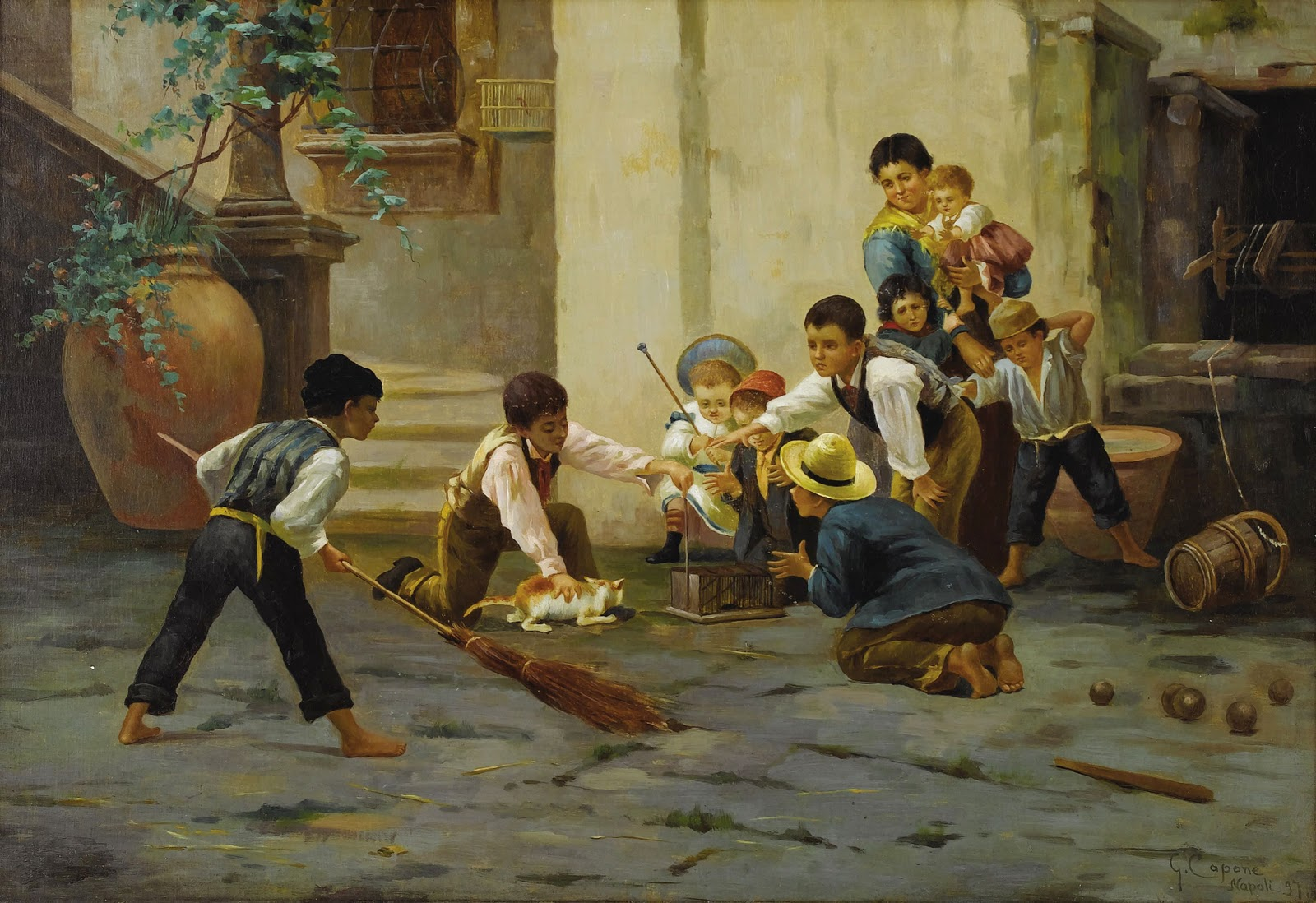
Caught at Last (1897) by Capone.

Gaetano Capone (1845–1924) was an Italian painter, mostly depicting landscapes and genre subjects.

== Biography ==
Gaetano was born to a family of painters in Maiori in the province of Salerno in Campania. His brother Luigi was also a painter. He moved to Naples to study painting, and from there, obtained a stipend from the province to move to Rome to study under Cesare Fracassini. One of his entries obtained a silver medal at a competition by Accademia di San Luca in Rome. He helped Fracassini with painting at the Basilica of San Lorenzo.

He returned to Maiori in 1868, where he painted frescoes in the Collegiata di Santa Maria a Mare, for the Abbey of La Trinità della Cava, and for the churches of Fisciano and Casalvelino. In Maiori, along with Raffaele D'Amato, he mentored a number of painters taking advantage of the panoramic locale to create a school of painters integrating landscape and culture into a school of painting loosely known as the Costaioli. Among the Costaioli painters are Angelo Della Mura, Antonio Ferrigno, Luigi Paolillo, Enrico Lucibello, and Pietro Scoppetta. In the first decades of the twentieth century, they were joined in Maiori by Antonio Rocco, Luca Albino, Manfredi Nicoletti, Ignazio Lucibello, Gaetano Cimini, Paolo Caruso, Ulderico Forcellini, and Vittorio Acabbo.

Gaetano's grandson, Gaetano Capone the younger (1933-2011) was also a painter. Gaetano the elder was knighted into the Order of the Crown of Italy and made honorary member of various academies. He died in Maiori.

Among his works are:

- Il mese Mariano, oil at Maiori Cathedral
- Paese a chiaro di Luna, oil sold to the American Admiral Farragut;
- Il catechismo al villaggio
- La contravvenzione al contadino
- La caccia al topo, bought by government of Uruguay
- La pappa, bought by government of Uruguay;
- La zingara
- La ritirala precipitosa
- L’incasso dei limoni, costume napoletano
- Vive o Re!, once on display at Museo di Capodimonte.
