= Ferrigno (surname) =

Ferrigno is an Italian surname which is most prevalent in the regions of Campania and Sicily and is also to be found among the American, French and Argentine Italian diaspora. Notable people with the surname include:

- Antonio Ferrigno (1863–1940), Italian painter
- Dan Ferrigno (born 1953), American football coach and former player
- Lou Ferrigno (born 1951), American actor
- Lou Ferrigno Jr. (born 1984), American actor
- Robert Ferrigno (born 1947), American author
- Steve Ferrigno (1900–1930), New York City mobster of Sicilian origin
