= Antonio Ferrigno =

Italian painter (1863–1940)

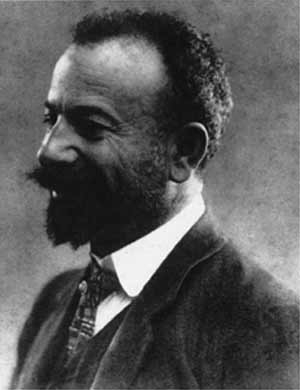
Antonio Ferrigno (date unknown)

Antonio Ferrigno (22 December 1863 – 12 December 1940) was an Italian painter best known for his landscapes and genre scenes created during a stay in Brazil.

== Biography ==
He was born in Maiori. Initially self-taught, his first art lessons were taken in the studios of Giacomo Di Chirico. He later was granted a scholarship to attend the Accademia di Belle Arti di Napoli, where he studied with Stanislao Lista and Teofilo Patini, graduating in 1885. This was followed by private studies with Domenico Morelli, during which he felt drawn to landscape painting.

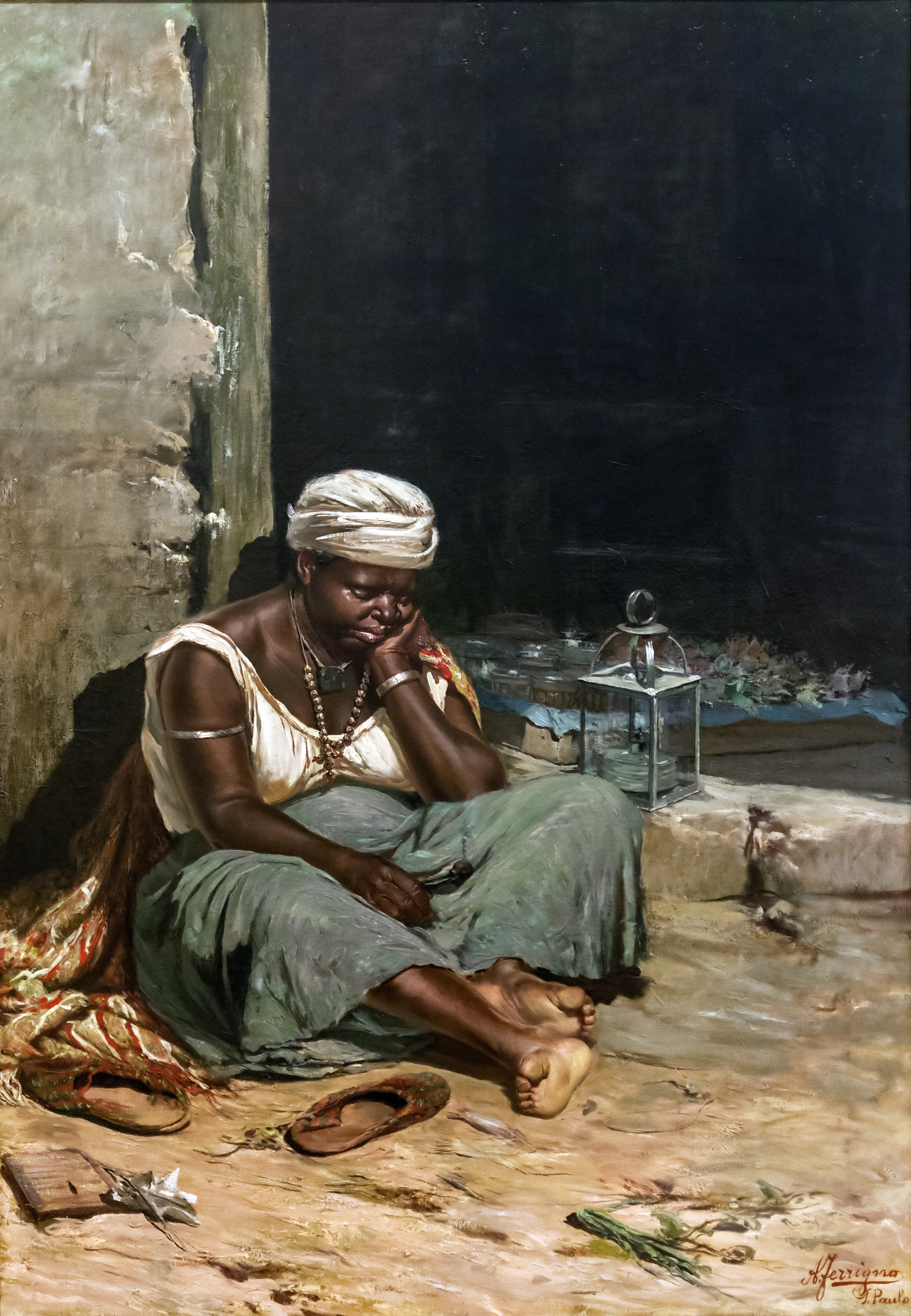
Plantation Worker Resting (1893)

He began exhibiting in 1882, and soon attracted many notable customers, including the Filangieri family, the Banco di Napoli and, in 1890, King Umberto I, who purchased his painting "March Sun" for the Museo di Capodimonte.

In 1893, he moved to Brazil, where he joined his friend Rosalbino Santoro in São Paulo. He remained there for twelve years and became known as the "painter of coffee", because he specialized in painting landscapes of the plantations, commissioned by wealthy farmers. A major exhibition of his work was held in Paris in 1900, in conjunction with campaigns to promote the drinking of coffee.

In addition to the promotional aspects, his paintings have documentary value, as they portray the period immediately following the Lei Áurea (abolition of slavery) in 1888. During this time, much of the manual labor on the plantations was performed by Italian immigrants (especially Venetians). Some of his paintings involving them were commissioned by the Italian government. His works cover every stage in the coffee production process.

From 1900 to 1904, he spent much of his time inland, with extended stays at plantations in Vitória and Santa Gertrudes. The latter was considered to be a "model settlement" as it was equipped with electricity and a telephone. A major showing of his coffee-related paintings was a great success at the Louisiana Purchase Exposition of 1904.

He held his final exhibition in Brazil in 1905, and returned to Italy, where he settled in Salerno and became a drawing teacher at the technical school in 1913. Two years later, he auctioned off many of his works to benefit the victims of an earthquake in Abruzzo. His paintings continued to display the natural colors that his palette had acquired in Brazil. These are especially prominent in a series of paintings depicting the Villa Rufolo that he created in the 1920s. Together with Gaetano Capone, Luigi Paolillo and Pietro Scoppetta, he was part of what became known as the "Scuola di Maiori" or, simply, the "Costaioli". He was a regular exhibitor at the Salon des indépendants in Paris. His last notable exhibition was for the "Sindacato provinciale fascista di belle arti", which took place in Positano in 1937. He died in 1940 in Salerno.

A major retrospective of his work was held in 2005 at the Pinacoteca do Estado de São Paulo, on the centenary of his departure.

== Selected paintings ==
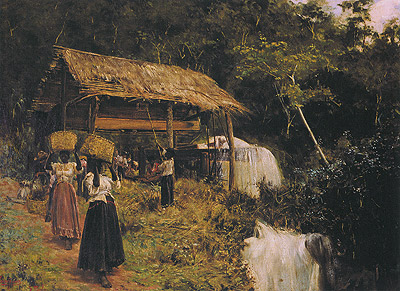
Water Mill

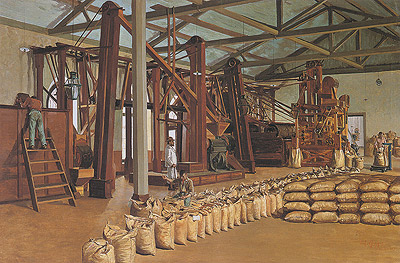
Bagging the Coffee

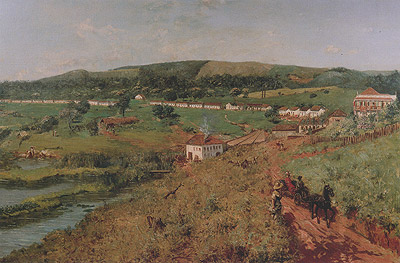
The Fazenda of the
Baron de Serra Negra
