= Luigi Paolillo =

Italian painter (1864–1934)

Luigi Paolillo (1864 – May 1934) was an Italian painter, mainly of genre works early in his career, and vedute of the seashore around Campania later in life.

== Biography ==
He was born in Maiori, in the province of Salerno, in Campania. He studied painting at the Academy of Fine Arts of Naples, where he won a number of awards. Among his teachers were Gaetano Capone and Raffaelle D’Amato. He exhibited frequently at exhibitions by the Promotrici Societies of Italy, and also at the National Exhibitions at Turin, and the Italian Exhibitions in London. He traveled extensively through Argentina and the Americas from 1890 to 1929, living for years in Buenos Aires, Argentina. The landscapes of Tierra del Fuego were a focus of his. Among his works are Neanche bolle!!; Nei miei monti; and Ci sarà!, once property of the painter Antonio Ferrigno. He died at Vietri sul Mare.
