= Alcibiade =

Alcibiade may refer to:

- Alcibiade, winner of 1865 Grand National horse race
- Alcibiade, alternate title of the 1693 opera La libertà contenta by Agostino Steffani
- Raffaele Alcibiade (born 1990), an Italian footballer

== See also ==
- Alcibiades (disambiguation)
