= Botucatu =

- Municipality
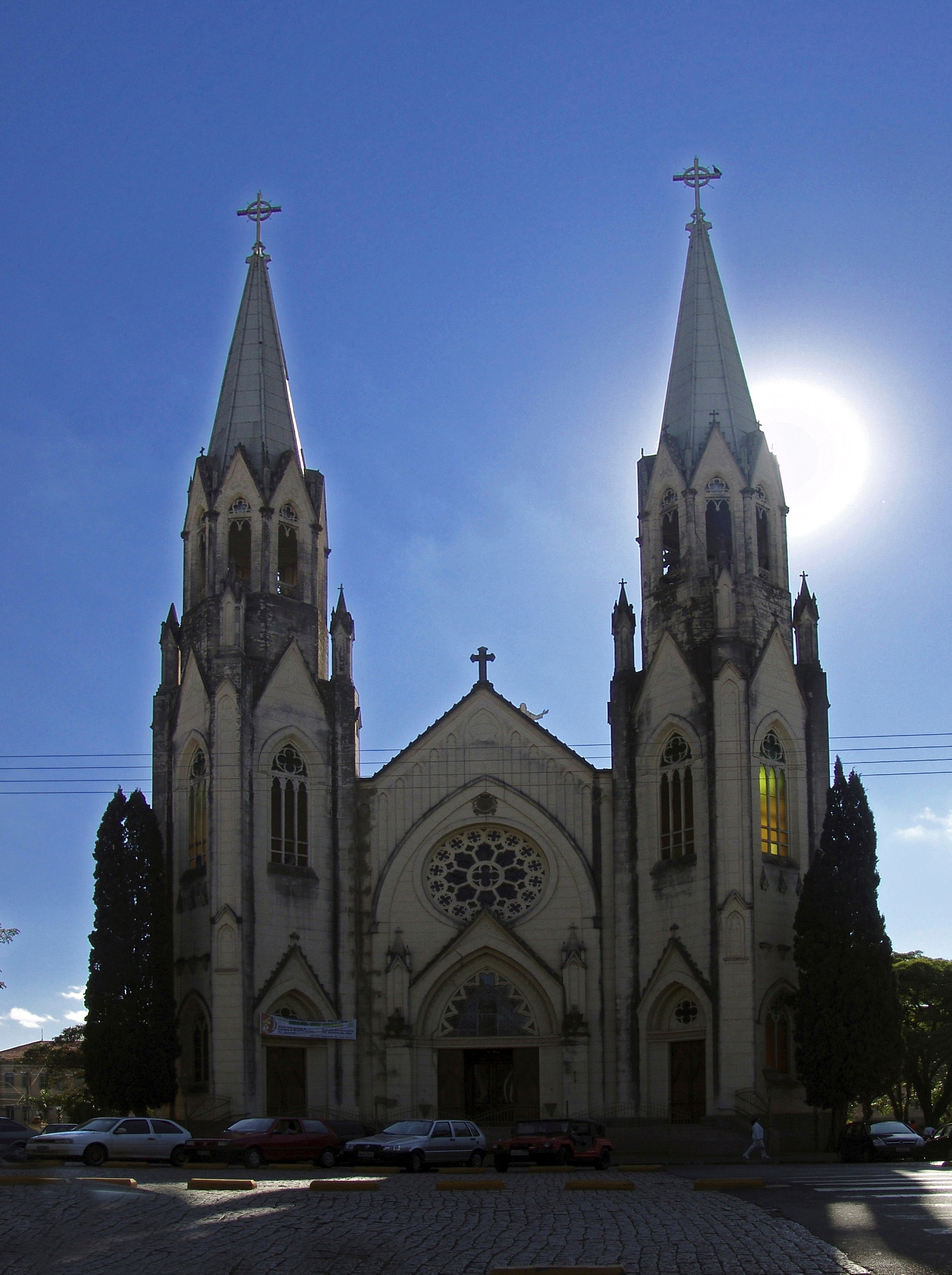
- Metropolitan Cathedral of Santana

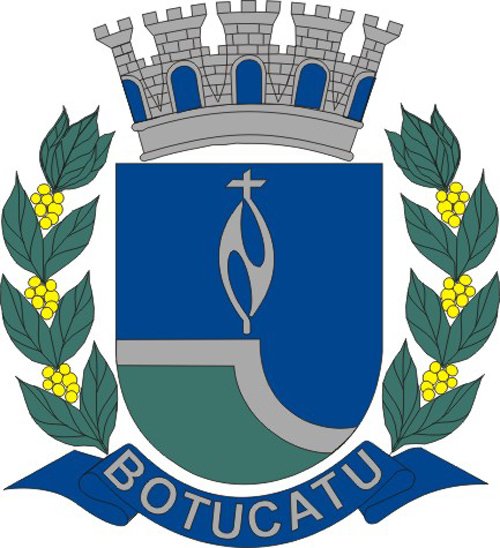
- Flag Coat of arms

- Location in São Paulo state

- Location in Brazil
- Coordinates: 22°53′09″S 48°26′42″W
- Country: Brazil
- Region: Southeast
- State: São Paulo

Area
  - Total: 1,482.64 km^{2} (572.45 sq mi)

Population (2022 Census)
  - Total: 145,155
  - Estimate (2025): 151,053
  - Rank: 204th, Brazil
  - Density: 97.9031/km^{2} (253.568/sq mi)
- Demonym: botucatuense
- Time zone: UTC-03:00 (BRT)

Botucatu is a city in the southeastern region of Brazil and is located 224.8 km (139.7 mi) from São Paulo, the capital of the state of São Paulo. It has an estimated population of 145,155 (as of 2022 Census) in an area of 1,482.64 km^{2} (572 sq mi). The elevation ranges from 756 to 920 metres above sea level. Botucatu became a village in 1855, and a city in 1876.

The region has humid-subtropical weather, with dry, cold winters and hot, wet summers. During winter the temperature rarely falls below 2 °C (36 °F). During most of the year, mainly at night, a breeze blowing over São Paulo plateau, from which Botucatu elevates about 200 m (660 ft), cools the city and surroundings; this cold everyday wind from the high plateaus is where the city got its name from.

Botucatu's biggest employer is UNESP, one of the three São Paulo state universities, one of the top universities in all of Latin America and part of several World Top Universities list, making the city an important center for medical research and education. In particular, the city has two campuses, one centered on biomedical sciences, including a school of medicine, an Institute of Biosciences and school of veterinarian sciences, and the other centered on agricultural sciences. The leading industrial company is Embraer through a subsidiary, Neiva, that has a multipurpose plant there but primarily manufacture the EMB 202 "Ipanemão" crop spraying aircraft. Along with Rondonópolis and Ribeirão Preto, it is one of the centers of the large Brazilian airborne spraying industry. The city has also two bus bodyworks builders, the Brazilian CAIO Induscar and the Basque Irizar. Besides UNESP, there are other private colleges.

The city boasts a higher than usual elementary and mid-level educational network, including public and private institutions. It is also an important center for "organic" agriculture being the site of a recognized certification body.

== History ==
The city of Botucatu, herein referred as such for being the seat of an archdiocese, has experienced many changes during a century and a half of existence, the most substantial being the arrival of the state university in 1960.

The modern name Botucatu derives from the old Tupi name "ybytukatu" meaning "good wind", and was applied in 1720 when the land here was parceled up and granted to settlers. Local legends survive that predate the period of structured settlement, however, relating to the time when Botucatu was the focus of a transit crossing along the route connecting the Atlantic coast with the Peruvian lands.

In the nineteenth century Old Botucatu was a place full of romantic characters such as coffee barons, musicians and poets and hinterland explorers. One of these is Conde (count) de Serra Negra, who is locally considered the father of Lawrence of Arabia and Rhett Butler, who is said to be buried there. Of note, Botucatu's municipal council has declared war on Great-Britain on two distinct occasions, with no actual consequences.

In April 2014 opened the first mall in the city.

== Demographics ==
Historical population (municipality)
Year	Population	%±
1920	33,405
1940	38,881	16.4%
1950	41,264	6.1%
1960	44,767	8.5%
1970	51,954	16.1%
1980	64,545	24.2%
1991	90,761	40.6%
2000	108,306	19.3%
2010	127,328	17.6%
2022	145,155	14.0%

== Climate ==
Climate data for Botucatu, elevation 789 m (2,589 ft), (1991–2020 normals, extremes 1990–2022)
Month	Jan	Feb	Mar	Apr	May	Jun	Jul	Aug	Sep	Oct	Nov	Dec	Year
Record high °C (°F)	35.0 (95.0)	35.5 (95.9)	34.6 (94.3)	37.4 (99.3)	30.6 (87.1)	32.0 (89.6)	30.0 (86.0)	33.2 (91.8)	37.6 (99.7)	39.2 (102.6)	34.9 (94.8)	37.8 (100.0)	39.2 (102.6)
Mean daily maximum °C (°F)	28.3 (82.9)	28.4 (83.1)	28.2 (82.8)	26.8 (80.2)	23.8 (74.8)	23.4 (74.1)	23.4 (74.1)	25.3 (77.5)	26.8 (80.2)	27.9 (82.2)	27.8 (82.0)	28.6 (83.5)	26.6 (79.8)
Daily mean °C (°F)	23.8 (74.8)	23.8 (74.8)	23.5 (74.3)	22.0 (71.6)	19.1 (66.4)	18.5 (65.3)	18.2 (64.8)	19.5 (67.1)	21.0 (69.8)	22.4 (72.3)	22.5 (72.5)	23.6 (74.5)	21.5 (70.7)
Mean daily minimum °C (°F)	19.3 (66.7)	19.2 (66.6)	18.8 (65.8)	17.1 (62.8)	14.4 (57.9)	13.6 (56.5)	12.9 (55.2)	13.8 (56.8)	15.3 (59.5)	16.9 (62.4)	17.2 (63.0)	18.5 (65.3)	16.4 (61.5)
Record low °C (°F)	12.0 (53.6)	14.4 (57.9)	14.0 (57.2)	7.8 (46.0)	4.0 (39.2)	1.2 (34.2)	0.2 (32.4)	5.0 (41.0)	5.0 (41.0)	9.0 (48.2)	10.1 (50.2)	12.0 (53.6)	0.2 (32.4)
Average precipitation mm (inches)	279.7 (11.01)	206.1 (8.11)	179.9 (7.08)	70.3 (2.77)	59.6 (2.35)	42.6 (1.68)	39.2 (1.54)	38.2 (1.50)	64.2 (2.53)	117.3 (4.62)	127.4 (5.02)	189.1 (7.44)	1,413.6 (55.65)
Source: Centro Integrado de Informações Agrometeorológicas

== Transportation ==
The city is served by Tancredo de Almeida Neves Airport.

== Media ==
In telecommunications, the city was served by Companhia Telefônica Brasileira until 1973, when it began to be served by Telecomunicações de São Paulo. In July 1998, this company was acquired by Telefónica, which adopted the Vivo brand in 2012.

The company is currently an operator of cell phones, fixed lines, internet (fiber optics/4G) and television (satellite and cable).

== See also ==
- List of municipalities in São Paulo
