= The Wiedmann Bible =

Bible in hand-painted images

The Wiedmann Bible depicts the complete Old and New Testament in images. The original includes 19 Leporello (concertina fold) books which contain 3,333 hand-painted images, and has a total length of 1.17 km (0.73 miles). Created by the Stuttgart artist Willy Wiedmann over a period of 16 years (1984–2000). Wiedmann painted the Bible based on his Polycon Painting Style which he invented in the 1960s.

== The Story ==
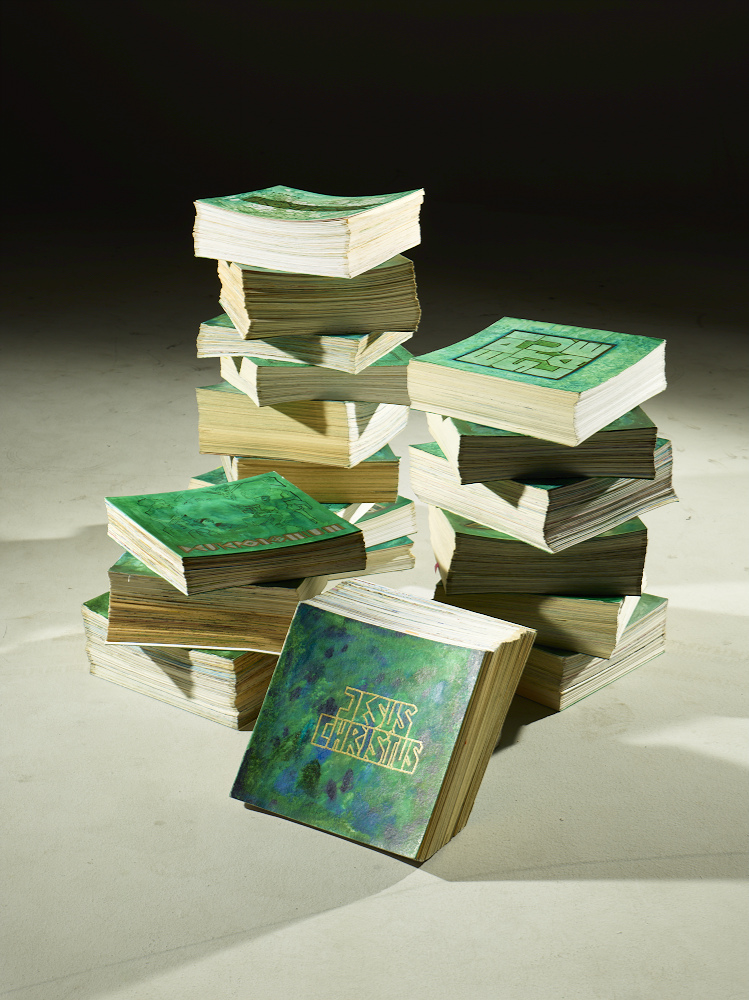
The Wiedmann Bible (original)

The idea of translating Bible verses into images was initiated in 1984, when Willy Wiedmann was assigned to redecorate the interior of the Pauluskirche in Stuttgart-Zuffenhausen/Germany. He always wanted to simplify and engage more people with the Bible. He finished his works in 2000. Due to the lack of technology, Wiedmann was not able to find a printery which had the prerequisites to publish the concertina book. Eventually he stored the Bible in his gallery's attic, including essays about his works, where it fell into oblivion. It was only after his death that his son discovered the four containers. He had all 3,333 images scanned and digitalised.

In 2017 the Swiss light show artist Gerry Hofstetter featured the Wiedmann Bible's images during his performances in which he illuminated the Grossmuenster in Zurich and monuments in each US state.

Since its discovery in 2013, the original Wiedmann Bible has only been exhibited a few times. In 2015 it premiered in June at the German Evangelical Church Assembly (Deutscher Evangelischer Kirchentag) in Stuttgart, Germany. From November 27, 2016 through February 5, 2017 it was on display at the Weygang-Museum in Öhringen, Germany. The Wiedmann Bible is showcased in an exhibit at the Museum of the Bible in Washington, D.C. from October 27, 2018 through April 28, 2019.

In 2017 the Wiedmann Bible already participated in two of the Museum of the Bible's exhibition "Our Book" in Germany from April 7 through May 13 in Augsburg and from May 22 through September 10 in Wittenberg. Both events were curated by the German linguist and theologian Roland Werner from Marburg and organised in cooperation with local partners.

On May 7 a facsimile of the artwork was completely unfolded for the first time at a length of 1517m (almost 1 mile). Occasion for the event was the celebration of the 500th Protestant Reformation anniversary in Magdeburg. At the same time a world record was set. In December 2017 the Wiedmann Bible was listed in the Guinness Book of World Records as the largest concertina folder with a size of 645.2 m² (6944 ft² 121 in²). Until August 2018 when the record was broken.

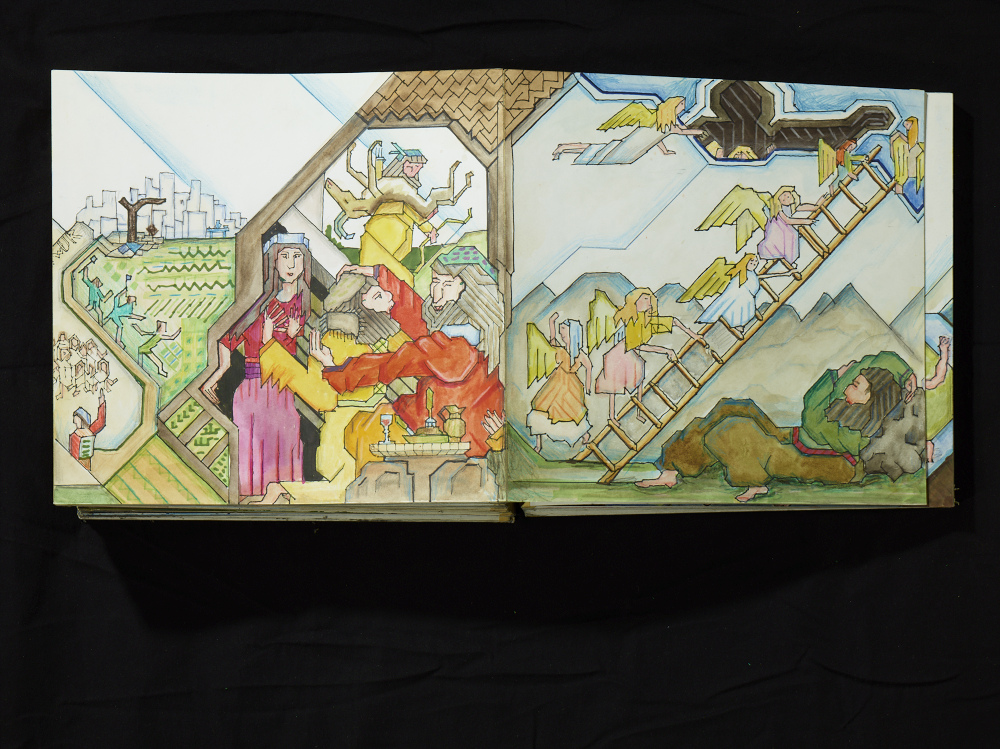
Gen 28 – Jacob's Ladder

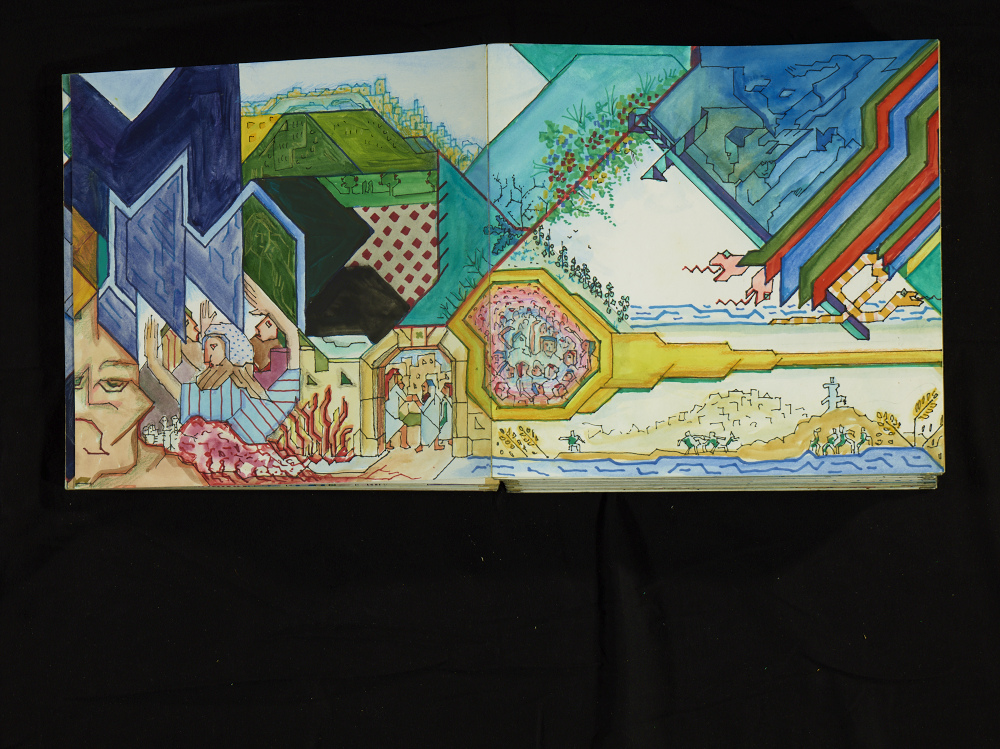
Is 26–27 – Song of Praise

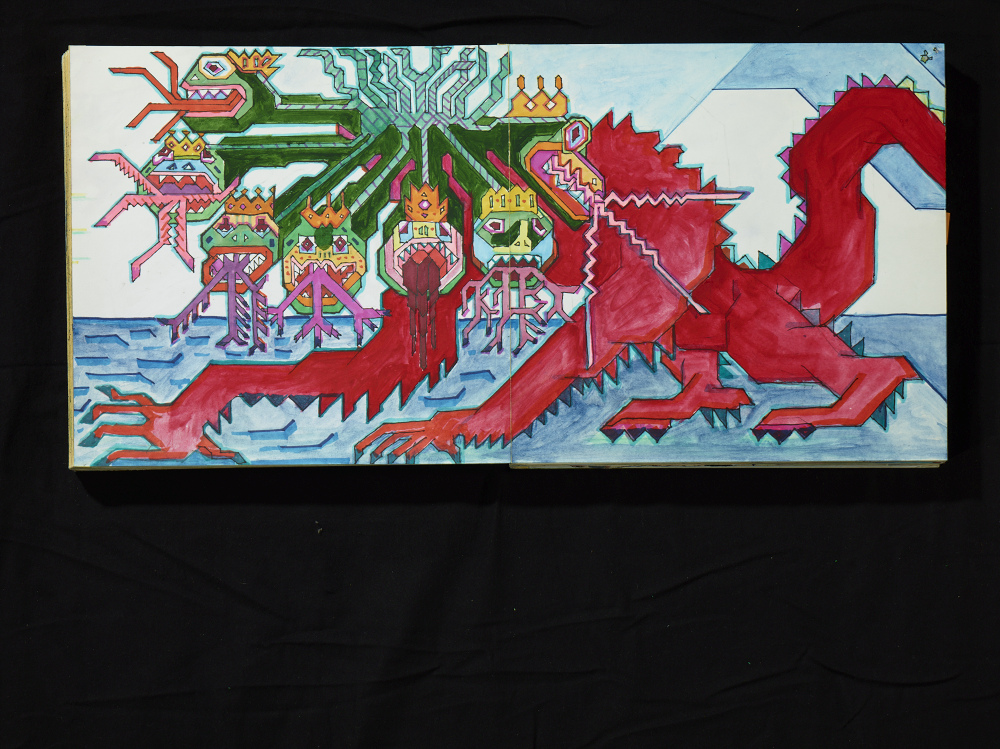
Rev 12:3 – Seven-headed Beast

In February 2018 the Wiedmann Bible was published as a book print for the very first time in collaboration with the German Bible Society. The ART-Edition is limited to 3,333 volumes and complemented by verses from the revised Luther Bible 2017. ART-Editions were taken into the collection of the Gutenberg-Museum in Mainz, Bavarian State Library in Munich, the Duchess Anna Amalia Library in Weimar, the Saxony's Main Bible Society in Dresden, the bibliorama - Bible Museum as well as the municipal archives in Stuttgart, and the Museum of the Bible in Washington, D.C.
