= Manuel Ernesto da Conceição, Count of Serra Negra =

Brazilian coffee farmer and promoter

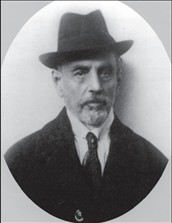
- Born: October 29, 1850
- Died: March 14, 1923 (aged 72)
- Occupation: Coffee farmer
- Known for: Promoter of Brazilian coffee in Europe
- Title: Count Romano de Serra Negra Chevalier du Mérite Agricole, received in 1909
- Spouse: Maria Justina de Sousa Resende
- Parents: Francisco José da Conceição, Barão de Serra Negra (father); Gertrudes Eufrosina da Rocha (mother)

Manuel Ernesto da Conceição (Piracicaba, São Paulo, 1850 - before 1935) was a Brazilian coffee farmer awarded the title of Count of Serra Negra by the Holy See.

He became actively involved in the propaganda and promotion of Paulistan coffee in Europe, spending a large fortune on the dissemination of this Brazilian product, highlighting the large coffee roasting establishment he installed in the center of Paris, the "Café São Paulo", with several branches in the provinces. In 1909, he was awarded the commendation of Chevalier du Mérite Agricole by the French government, in reward for his services to the dissemination of Brazilian coffee.

== Genealogy ==
He was the son of Francisco José da Conceição, Baron of Serra Negra, and Gertrudes Eufrosina da Rocha; paternal grandson of Antônio José da Conceição and Rita Morato de Carvalho; and maternal grandson of Captain Manuel da Rocha Garcia and Ana Joaquina do Amaral Rocha.

He married Maria Justina de Sousa Resende in 1893, daughter of Pedro Ribeiro de Sousa Resende (Baron of Valença) and Justina Emerich, (Note: His genealogy and family tree are described in Revista Genealógica Brasileira, #5, p. 201.) leaving descendants.

In 1997, the Botucatu lawyer Armando Moraes Delmanto published in issue #6 of Peabiru magazine the article "The legendary Lawrence of Arabia - A Brazilian Born in Botucatu", in which he defends the hypothesis of the Count of Serra Negra being the biological father of T. E. Lawrence, popularized as Lawrence of Arabia.

== Paulista coffee advertisement in Europe ==
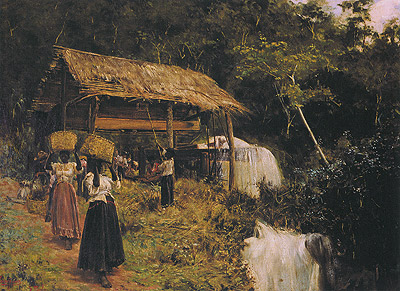
Monjolo, Victória Farm - Painting by Antonio Ferrigno commissioned by the Count of Serra Negra

In 1900, when he noticed that a crisis was beginning to develop in the coffee industry due to overproduction, he had the idea to launch a campaign to advertise Brazilian coffee in Europe, inviting to his Victória Farm the Salerno painter Antonio Ferrigno, known as 'the coffee painter' because he portrayed the farms of the proud owners. He commissioned from the painter a total of twelve canvases depicting the coffee plantations and the life and customs of the Paulistan countryside, in an unprecedented project to create works of art intended to serve as advertising for the Brazilian product. The paintings were shown at the 1900 Universal Exposition in Paris, and later in several European capitals, in exhibitions to promote coffee from São Paulo. This contributed to the fact that in the coffee exhibitions held in Europe, the coffee of the Count of Serra Negra won the highest prizes. With the return of Conceição to Brazil, Ferrigno's paintings also returned, some of which remain in the family today.

In 1902, he opened a shop in Paris, later called "Café São Paulo", which was considered the most important of those opened in Europe to trade and spread Brazilian coffee. The café was located at the faubourg de Montmartre, n. 43. From there, thousands of kilos of coffee left daily to be distributed in the capital and other provinces. Decorating this export store was another canvas by Antonio Ferrigno, representing the farm Bom Jardim, to show potential customers where coffee came from.

In April 1908, he had an artistic pavilion built at the International Food and Hygiene Exhibition, held in the Tuileries Gardens, where products related to Brazil were exhibited, especially coffee and mate, which included free distribution of these beverages. The count was awarded a gold medal by the Exhibition jury.

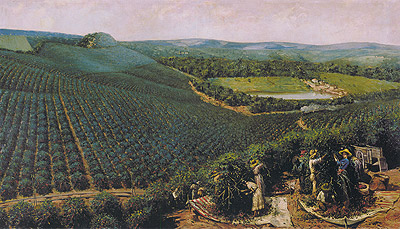
Victória Farm, of the Counts of Serra Negra, painted by Antonio Ferrigno.

In September 1909, the Parisian illustrated magazine La Vie Heureuse, in its number nine, reporting on the Nancy Exhibition, had high praise for the section of the "Café São Paulo" set up by Conceição, in an article illustrated with the portraits of the Count and Countess of Serra Nova, as well as a view of the coffee plantations of one of the farms he owned in Botucatu.

The Countess of Serra Negra actively participated in the fight against the coffee crisis. Despite being the mother of nine children, it was she who took São Paulo's coffee to the great coffee exhibitions held in European capitals, personally in charge of distributing thousands of cups of Paulistan coffee to visitors. At all these exhibitions she took Ferrigno's works to decorate her stand and teach visitors where the coffee they were drinking came from. A cultured and intelligent woman, after returning from Europe she maintained her active stance by regularly writing articles for O Estado de S. Paulo.

These campaigns would only end with the First World War, in 1914, when the coffee in the port of Le Havre was requisitioned by the French government, forcing the family to return to Brazil shortly thereafter. The losses of this campaign were enormous, shattering the family fortune, but the Count had no regrets, as he believed that intelligent propaganda abroad would save Brazil from the coffee crisis. To this end, he advised the establishment of good coffee roasting houses and establishments selling coffee in cups, and that foreigners be taught to drink pure coffee, without mixtures of chicory and other roasted flours. At that time, among Europeans, it was customary to use the powder that had already been used, the "marco", by adding only a small amount of fresh coffee. For the count, all these subterfuges resulted in overproduction, which could be combated if everyone drank pure coffee.

== Property and posthumous legacy ==
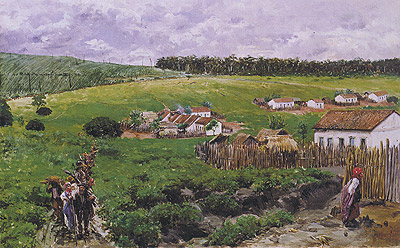
Settlers going to work, Victória Farm - by Antonio Ferrigno.

Manuel Ernesto da Conceição was a large coffee producer, owning fifteen estates in the states of Rio de Janeiro and São Paulo, with two million coffee trees, and was considered one of the richest coffee growers in São Paulo.

At the end of the 19th century, (Note: In the Relatório Agicola, the date 1929 is noted, which is likely a typo, as this property is documented in his possession at a date prior to 1900, when he commissioned the series of twelve paintings depicting the property to Antonio Ferrigno.) he acquired the farm Villa Victória, in Botucatu, today known as 'Fazenda do Conde de Serra Negra' ("Count of Serra Negra's Farm"), with an area of 1,093 bushels, containing 60,000 coffee trees, twenty-four bushels of sugarcane, two thousand eucalyptus trees, one hundred brick and tile-roofed settlers' houses, a main house, an orchard, self-sustained electricity, coffee, and rice processing machinery, sugarcane grinding mill, and other improvements.

By 1910, Manuel Ernesto da Conceição has 300,000 coffee trees on his farm in Villa Victoria. The same amount was recorded in 1935, the year he died, and the property was owned by the Countess of Serra Negra and her children. After the count's death, half of the farm was left to his widow, and the other half was divided among his seven children, who sold their shares to several people, thus dividing the farm. Most of it, after passing through several owners, belongs today to the São Manuel Factory.

In 1908, the farm had around 435,000 coffee plants. At that date, the total production of the farms owned by the Conceição family in the municipality of Botucatu reached 1,380,000 trees, on land that included the present Lajeado, Edgardia, Belém da Vala farms and several other smaller farms in the highlands of terra roxa.

In October 1912, there was a band on Victória Farm called Villa Victoria Band, conducted by Professor Andrelino Vieira. According to the words of O Botucatuense, in an article of the time, "This magnificent musical band, which is competently uniform, is composed exclusively of elements from the important farm Villa Victoria, owned by Mr. Manoel Ernesto da Conceição."

Around the turn of the century, he bought the Barão do Rio Pardo Palace, on Alameda Ribeiro da Silva, São Paulo, which he later rented to set up a boys' boarding school, Colégio Sílvio Almeida. This boarding school operated from 1908 to 1913, when it became home to the 4th Hunters Battalion.

The avenue Conde de Serra Negra, in Botucatu, is so named in his honor. Around 1940, there were also in Botucatu the soccer clubs Serra Negra F. C. and Grupo Escolar Conde de Serra Negra.

== Works ==
- Valorisation du café du Brésil, Imp. F. Payen et N. Chatelain, 1907, 13 pages
- Producção, commercio e defesa do café, Imp. P. Jouet, 1907, 12 pages

== Bibliography ==
- Figueiredo Pupo, Trajano Carlos de (2001). Botucatu Antigamente 1 (das Origens até 1917) (in Brazilian Portuguese). Itu: Ottoni. ISBN 85-7464-010-7.
- Figueiredo Pupo, Trajano Carlos de (2001). Botucatu Antigamente 2 (de 1918 a 1948) (in Brazilian Portuguese). Itu: Ottoni. ISBN 85-7464-010-7.
- Tarasantchi, Ruth Sprung (2005). Antonio Ferrigno: 100 anos depois (in Brazilian Portuguese). Pinacoteca.
