= Rosalbino Santoro =

Italian painter

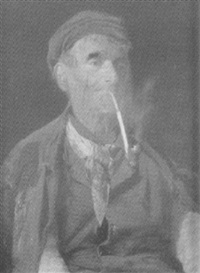
Rosalbino Santoro

Rosalbino Santoro (May 15, 1858 – circa 1920) was an Italian painter, mainly of vedute with figures in native dress.

He was born in Fuscaldo, Calabria. His parents wished him to become a priest, but he preferred to study painting, and by 1878, he was recommended for awards by Raffaele Postiglione, professor of Institute of Fine Arts of Naples. The next year, the new president of the institute, Filippo Palizzi, awarded him the first prize in medal for design. Rosalbino donated to his hometown, pastel portraits of King Umberto and Queen Margherita, and of Bernardino Telesio. In 1880, after two years of study, Rosalbino exhibited at the Promotrice of Naples then at the 1881 Exhibition of Milan with his paintings: Bagni di Guardia piemontese; Pagliaie di alloggio; Due amiche; Una marina. At the exhibitions of Rome and Naples, he displayed il Fanfulla. He contributed drawings to il Corriera del mattino, l' Italia artistica di Florence, and il Journal d'Italie. In the late 1880s, he moved to Brazil and established a successful practice. He died in 1920 in Brazil.
