= Willy Wiedmann =

German painter

Wilhelm Richard Heinrich "Willy" Wiedmann
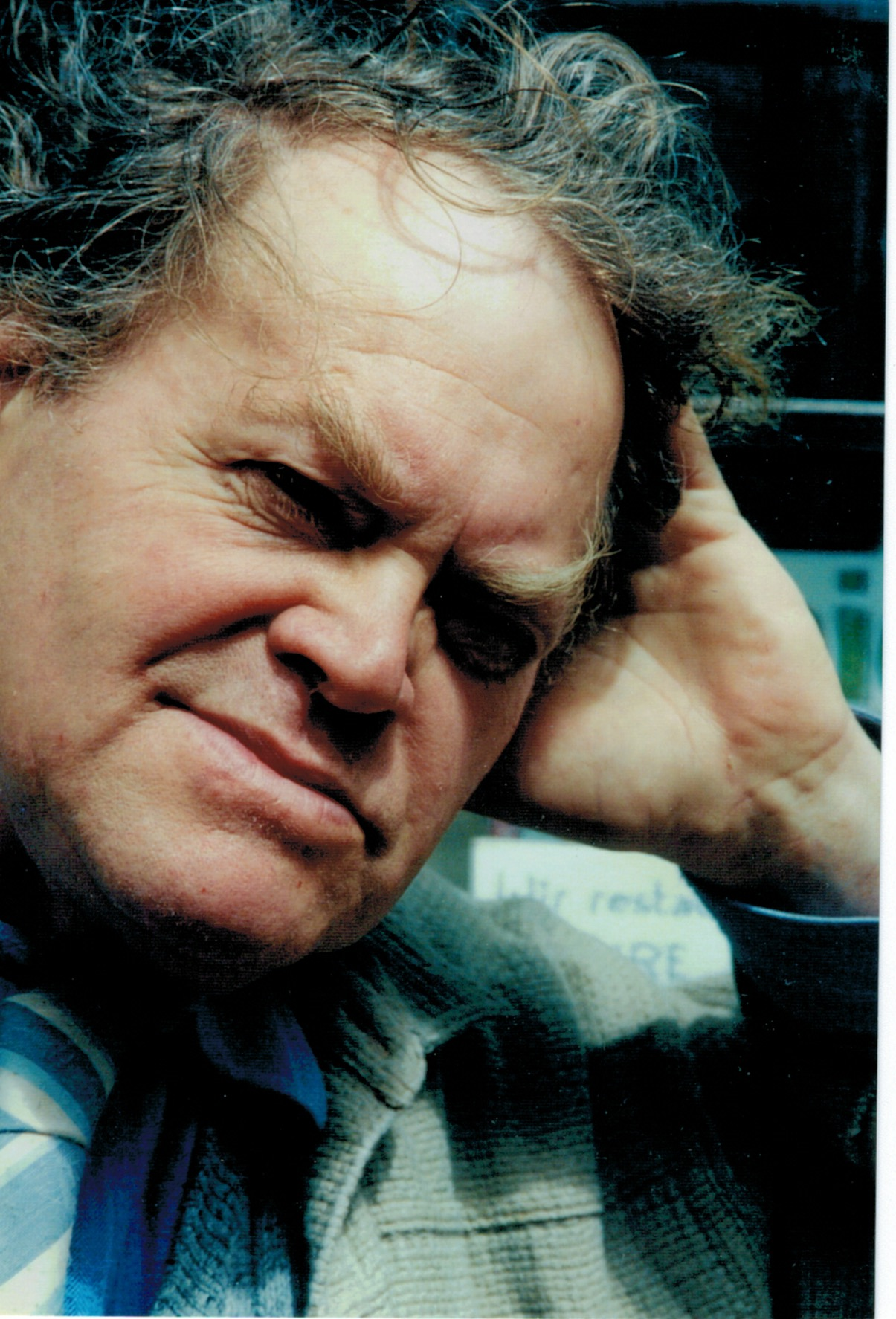
- Willy Wiedmann

Background information
- Born: 14 March 1929; Ettlingen, Germany
- Died: 21 June 2013 (aged 84) Bad Cannstatt, Stuttgart, Germany
- Occupations: Painter, muralist, sculptor, musician, composer, writer, author, publisher, art dealer
- Instruments: Accordion, violin, flute
- Years active: 20th century

Wilhelm Richard Heinrich "Willy" Wiedmann (14 March 1929 in Ettlingen, Germany – 21 June 2013 in Bad Cannstatt, Stuttgart) was a German painter, muralist, sculptor, musician, composer, writer, author, publisher, and art dealer.

== The artist ==
Wilhelm "Willy" Wiedmann worked in many art directions, creating compositions, poems, paintings, and invented his own painting style: the Polycon painting. Wiedmann also attended and organised national and international exhibitions. Throughout his career Wiedmann engaged with several famous artists such as Pablo Picasso, Georges Braque, and Salvador Dalí. He was Stuttgart's first art dealer who displayed Dalí's art in his own gallery, "Galerie am Jakobsbrunnen." Willy Wiedmann received the Order of Merit of the Federal Republic of Germany in 2002 for his work in the service of art and culture.

== The musician and composer ==
At the age of four Willy Wiedmann played the accordion; one year later, the violin and flute. In 1939 he had first appearance at a chamber orchestra. At thirteen Wiedmann wrote his first minuet, one of many compositions. Throughout his life he created 150 Opus works. Wiedmann studied music between 1950 and 1958 at the State University of Music and Performing Arts Stuttgart, as a student of Johann Nepomuk David. From 1954 to 1964 he worked as a freelance musician and composer at the Württembergischen Staatstheater Stuttgart, and between 1964 and 1982 for several German television and radio stations such as SDR, SWF, ARD, and ZDF. For over ten years, Wiedmann played as a professional jazz musician, collaborating on-stage with many artists including Louis Armstrong, Ella Fitzgerald, Stan Getz, Lionel Hampton and Oscar Peterson.

== The painter and art dealer ==
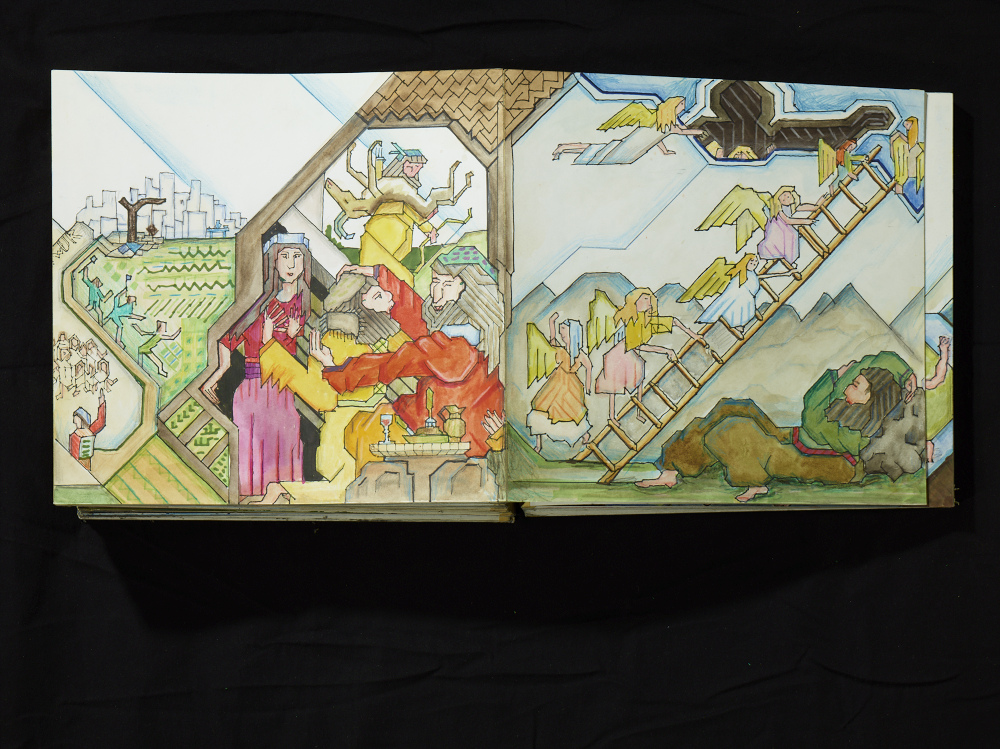
The Wiedmann Bible – Polycon Painting

In addition to his musical career, Willy Wiedmann studied painting at the State Academy of Art and Design in Stuttgart (1960–1963), attending classes of Professor Willi Baumeister. After his studies, he invented the art of "Polycon painting" (Polykonmalerei) which he officially exhibited for the first time in 1965 at the Galerie am Jakobsbrunnen in Bad Cannstatt, Stuttgart. Throughout his career Wiedmann created over 30,000 paintings, which were presented in galleries worldwide.

Between 1975 and 1998 Wiedmann redesigned artwork in churches in Germany, Italy, Austria, etc. Examples include the Martinskirche in Wildberg, "Martinsfenster" in 1982, in cooperation with Volker Saile and Laleh Bastian, and the Pauluskirche in Zuffenhausen, Stuttgart in 1984.

The convergence between art and church gave Wiedmann the idea for his main work: "The Wiedmann Bible". He worked for sixteen years (1984–2000) painting the 3,333 pictures, folded into an accordion-pleat style book (leporello). Wiedmann claimed that The Wiedmann Bible is the world's longest painted Christian Bible. It is painted in Wiedmann's own Polycon style.

In 1964, Wiedmann opened his first art gallery Galerie am Jakobsbrunnen in Bad Cannstatt, Stuttgart. He exhibited as one of the first art dealers of "Wiener Schule" and Neoclassicism, Salvador Dalí at his gallery (1966), as well as Nkoane Harry Moyaga during the restrictive period of South African apartheid (1977). He was the first art dealer in Europe to exhibit the works of a black South African painter throughout this time. Wiedmann ran a total of six national and international galleries throughout his career: among others are Pictures for Business in New York (1967–1977), TWS-Etagengalerie in Stuttgart (1972–1977, director), and Kunsthoefle in Bad Cannstatt, Stuttgart (1983–1985, director).

== The author and publisher ==
Despite his profession as a painter, art dealer, musician, and composer, Wiedmann also pursued his passion for writing. He wrote seven books (author or illustrator), of which he published most of them himself. Other literary works include 500 poems, lyrics, and audio plays. Wiedmann often wrote using several pen-names, for example "Alkibiades Zickle", inspired by a favorite restaurant of his, "Zickle" in Bad Cannstatt.

He uses pseudonyms including Emilio Gräsli, Alkibiades Zickle, Marc Johann, Theodor Abtsfeld, George Yugone, Eugen von Engelsbogen and Allan Doe.

== Personal life ==
Wilhelm Richard Heinrich (Willy) Wiedmann was born in 1929 in Ettlingen, Karlsruhe, Germany to his parents Richard and Klara Wiedmann, née Weiss. He was married to Klara Wiedmann, née Wagner, and fathered three children Richard, Cornelia and Martin. Wiedmann was known for his two pet Schnauzers: Jakob and Jakobine, named after his "Galerie am Jakobsbrunnen". They accompanied him and his wife on their trips, tours, exhibitions and festivals. Wiedmann died in 2013 at the age of 84 Jahren in Bad Cannstatt, Stuttgart.

Wilhelm Wiedmann was involved with several associations and organizations. He donated works to charity events, was a charity auctioneer himself, and a respected art critic. Starting in 1968 he took on private students such as the German actor Walter Schultheiss or the artists Laleh Bastian and Ute Hadam. Wiedmann was also very committed to the local art scene and culture and one of the founders of "Cultur in Cannstatt" (Stuttgart) in 1988.

== Wiedmann in Numbers ==
- 3 Breuninger department stores – redesign
- 4 churches – painted
- 6 galleries – managed
- 7 books – author and illustrator
- 10 fund-raiser – donor, auctioneer, etc.
- 500 poems – author
- 150 compositions
- 3.333 pages long Bible illustration in Polycon painting (Wiedmann Bible)
- 30.000 paintings

== Works ==
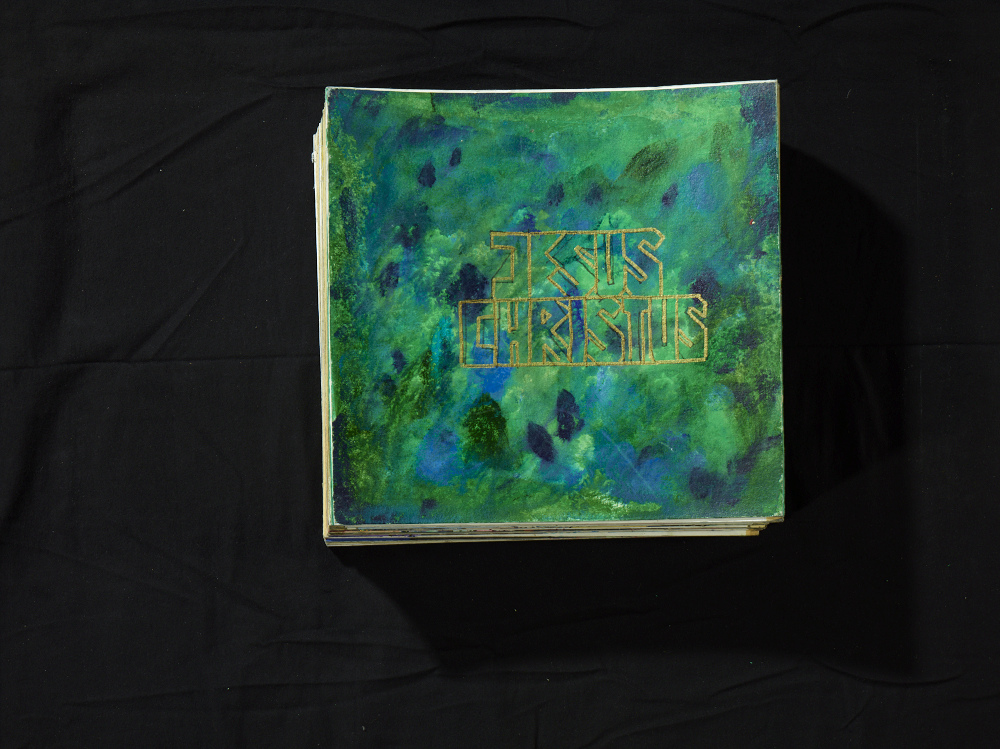
The Wiedmann Bible - Polycon Painting

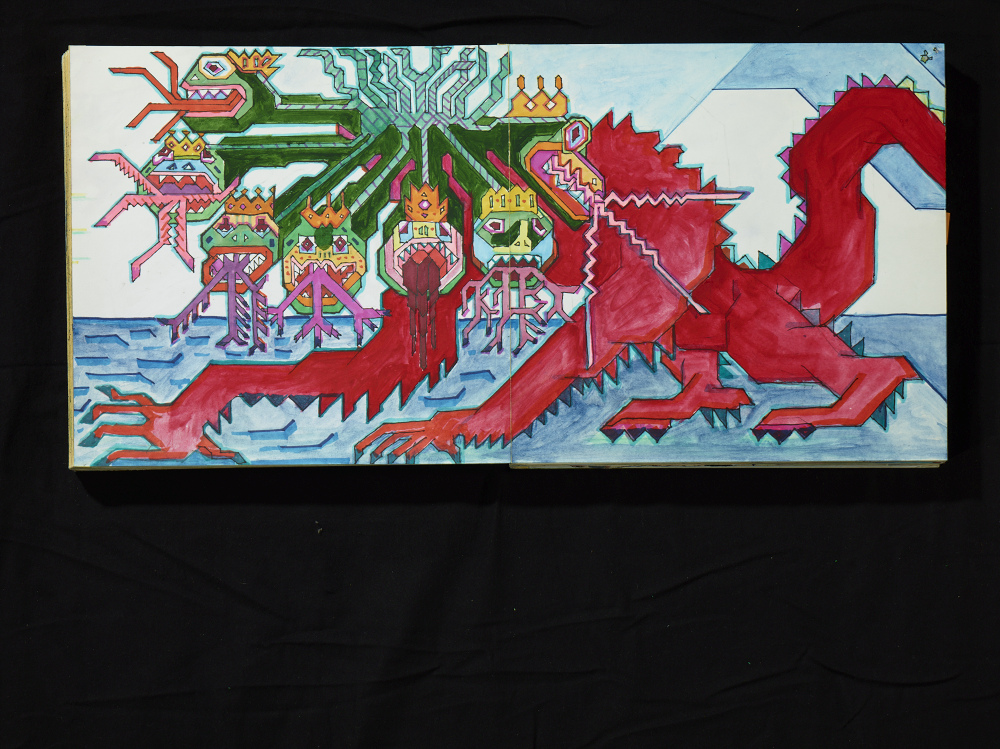
The Wiedmann Bible - Polycon Painting

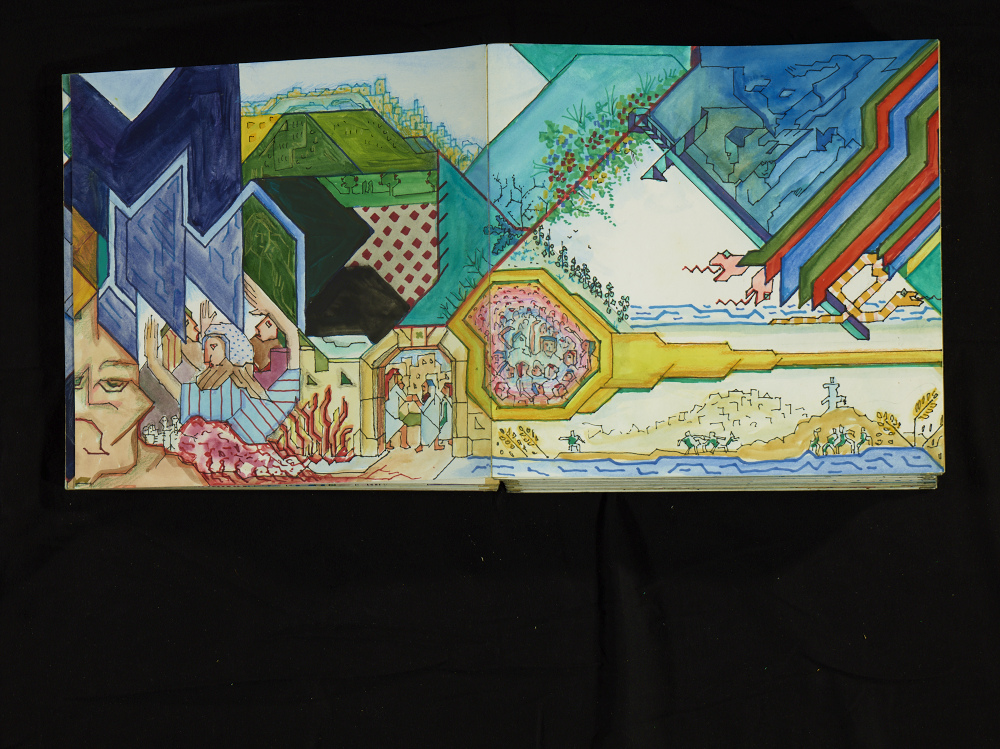
The Wiedmann Bible - Polycon Painting

Works in Public Spaces include:

- Polycon painting at Pauluskirche
- At Martinskirche he designed a notable glass window, "Martinsfenster", representing Jesus anointed by a Sinful Woman at Simon's premises (Lucas 7).
- "Projekt Weinkeller", Mall, township Kuchen, Göppingen in cooperation with Laleh Bastian and Volker Saile.

== Exhibitions ==
=== 1964–1967 ===
- 1964 Willy Wiedmann: 1. Vernissage Galerie am Jakobsbrunnen – as a group; Bad Cannstatt, Stuttgart, Germany
- 1964Willy Wiedmann: Jahresausstellung Galerie am Jakobsbrunnen – as a group; Bad Cannstatt, Stuttgart, Germany
- 1965 Willy Wiedmann: "Polykonmalerei" – Galerie am Jakobsbrunnen, Galerie am Berg, Galerie Tangente, Bad Cannstatt, Stuttgart, Germany
- 1966 Willy Wiedmann: "Wechselausstellung" – Galerie am Jakobsbrunnen Bad Cannstatt, Stuttgart, Germany and Forum Graz; Graz, Austria
- 1967 Willy Wiedmann: "Polykonmalerei" – Inter Gallery –; Brussels, Belgium

=== 1970–1976 ===
- 1970 Stuttgart Graphic Artists: Galerie Pictures for Business, 2-jährige Kunst-Tournee durch Universitäten und Bibliotheken in den USA (unter anderem Royalton College, South Royalton, Vermont und Half Hollow Hills Community Library (Gruppe)); USA
- 1970 George Yugone: "Moonart" – Galerie am Jakobsbrunnen; Bad Cannstatt, Stuttgart, Germany
- 1971 Eugen von Engelsbogen: "Die letzten Tage der Menschen" Grafiken – Galerie am Jakobsbrunnen; Bad Cannstatt, Stuttgart, Germany
- 1971 Eugen von Engelsbogen: "Kalenderbilder" – Galerie am Jakobsbrunnen; Bad Cannstatt, Stuttgart, Germany
- 1974 Eugen von Engelsbogen: Farbstiftzeichungen aus dem Zyklus "Der Tag Null" – Galerie am Jakobsbrunnen; Bad Cannstatt, Stuttgart, Germany
- 1974 Theodor Abtsfeld: Aquarelle und Bilder – Galerie am Jakobsbrunnen; Bad Cannstatt, Stuttgart, Germany
- 1975 Mark Johann: "Altes und neues Stuttgart" Tuschezeichnungen – TWS – Etagengalerie; Stuttgart, Germany
- 1975 Eugen von Engelsbogen: Farbstiftzeichungen – Galerie am Jakobsbrunnen; Bad Cannstatt, Stuttgart, Germany
- 1975 Emilio Gräsli: "Aquarelle eines Beleidigten" – Galerie am Jakobsbrunnen; Bad Cannstatt, Stuttgart, Germany
- 1976 Allan Doe: "Romanzen in Alu" – Galerie am Jakobsbrunnen; Bad Cannstatt, Stuttgart, Germany
- 1976 Emilio Gräsli: "Aquarelle" – Galerie am Jakobsbrunnen; Bad Cannstatt, Stuttgart, Germany

=== 1980–1989 ===
- 1980 Emilio Gräsli: "Der Herr hat gesagt" Aquarelle – Galerie am Jakobsbrunnen; Bad Cannstatt, Stuttgart, Germany
- 1980 Theodor Abtsfeld: "Gouachen" – Galerie am Jakobsbrunnen; Bad Cannstatt, Stuttgart, Germany
- 1982 Emilio Gräsli: Aquarelle – "Liberté" Galerie Grand Rue 11; Fribourg, Switzerland
- 1983 Allan Doe: "Sateliten" – Galerie am Jakobsbrunnen; Bad Cannstatt, Stuttgart, Germany
- 1983 Eugen von Engelsbogen: "Mord überall" Folterszenen – Galerie am Jakobsbrunnen; Bad Cannstatt, Stuttgart, Germany
- 1983 Emilio Gräsli: "Aquarelle" – Galerie am Jakobsbrunnen; Bad Cannstatt, Stuttgart, Germany
- 1984 Willy Wiedmann: "Polykon Stelen" – Bildhauergarten; Bad Cannstatt, Stuttgart, Germany
- 1985 Emilio Gräsli: "Aquarelle" – Galerie am Jakobsbrunnen; Bad Cannstatt, Stuttgart, Germany
- 1985 Emilio Gräsli: "Mein Herr, Sie haben etwas verloren" Aquarelle – Galerie am Jakobsbrunnen; Bad Cannstatt, Stuttgart, Germany
- 1985 Allan Doe: "Technik im Weltraum" – Galerie am Jakobsbrunnen; Bad Cannstatt, Stuttgart, Germany
- 1986 Willy Wiedmann: "Köpfe"– Galerie Kunsthöfle; Bad Cannstatt, Stuttgart, Germany
- 1986 Willy Wiedmann: "Vita-Polykone" – Galerie am Jakobsbrunnen; Bad Cannstatt, Stuttgart, Germany
- 1986 Willy Wiedmann: "Balken-Polykone" – Bildhauergarten; Bad Cannstatt, Stuttgart, Germany
- 1986 Theodor Abtsfeld: "Landschaften" – Galerie am Jakobsbrunnen; Bad Cannstatt, Stuttgart, Germany
- 1987 Emilio Gräsli: "Kopf der Köpfe" – Galerie am Jakobsbrunnen; Stuttgart, Germany
- 1988 Willy Wiedmann: "Polykonwerke zu Kompositionen von Dietrich Buxtehude" – Galerie am Kunsthöfle; Stuttgart, Germany
- 1989 Emilio Gräsli: "Aquarelle einer Reise" – Galerie am Jakobsbrunnen; Stuttgart, Germany
- 1989 Willy Wiedmann: "Polykonkompositionen" – Bildhauergarten; Bad Cannstatt, Stuttgart, Germany

=== 1992–1999 ===
- 1992 Emilio Gräsli: "Heilige Pflastersteine " – Aquarelle – Club Transatlântico via Galeria de Arte Karin Kupfer; Sâo Paulo, Brazil
- 1992 Willy Wiedmann: "Mozart im Quadrat" – Galerie am Jakobsbrunnen; Stuttgart, Germany
- 1992 Emilio Gräsli: "Spinnlein, Spinnlein auf der Haut" Aquarelle – Galerie am Jakobsbrunnen; Stuttgart, Germany
- 1998 Willy Wiedmann: "Occasion Musical" – Galerie am Kunsthöfle; Stuttgart, Germany
- 1999 Willy Wiedmann: "Expolykone" – Cannstatter Volksbank - Stuttgart, Germany

=== 2005–2007 ===
- 2005 Willy Wiedmann: "Space Views" Carl-Zeiss-Planetarium und Foyer Amtsgericht, Stuttgart, Germany
- 2006 Allan Doe: "Collagen und Zeichnungen" – Galerie am Jakobsbrunnen; Stuttgart, Germany
- 2007 Willy Wiedmann: "Humanity" – Galerie am Kunsthöfle; Stuttgart, Germany

=== 2016–2018 (posthumous) ===
- 2016–2017 Willy Wiedmann: "Special Exhibition – The Wiedmann-Bible and Willy Wiedmann's Life" (27 November – 5 February) – Weygang-Museum, Öhringen
- 2017–2018 Willy Wiedmann: "The Wiedmann Bible Exhibition" showcasing Willy Wiedmann's life, the artist, and life's work (October 27 – April 28) – Museum of the Bible, Washington, D.C., U.S.

== Literature ==
- Der Rittergarten. Die Gedichte des hochwohlgeborenen und weithin gepriesen und bekannten Melanchthon vom Knitterthal. Alkibiades Zickle, Emilio Graesli (author); Ohne Verlagsangaben, 1981.
- Wenn's donnert und blitz: Feierobendgedichte und sonschtiges. Alkibiades Zickle, Emilio Gräsli Stuttgart: O. P. Veit; Stuttgart : W. Wiedmann, 1982.
- Cannstatter G'schnatter. Gedichte von Alkibiades Zickle. Zeichnungen von Marc Johann; Stuttgart – Bad Cannstatt: Galerie am Jakobsbrunnen, 1982.
- Stuttgarter Hufschlag. Altes und neues Stuttgart. Gedichte. Alkibiades Zickle (author), Marc Johann (illustrator); Stuttgart – Bad Cannstatt: Galerie am Jakobsbrunnen, 1982.
- 25 Jahre Galerie am Jakobsbrunnen. Willy Wiedmann; Stuttgart – Bad Cannstatt: Jakobsbrunnenverlag, 1989.
- 50 Jahre Kunsthöfle Bad Cannstatt. Hrsg.: Galerie Kunsthöfle Bad Cannstatt. Red.: Willy Wiedmann; Stuttgart-Bad Cannstatt, 1986.

== Notes ==
- Archive Cannstatter Zeitung
- Some data is based on written, unpublished information from Willy Wiedmann and his son Martin Wiedmann, as well as the students Laleh Bastian and Ute Hadam.
