= Alcibiades the Schoolboy =

Book by Antonio Rocco published anonymously in 1652

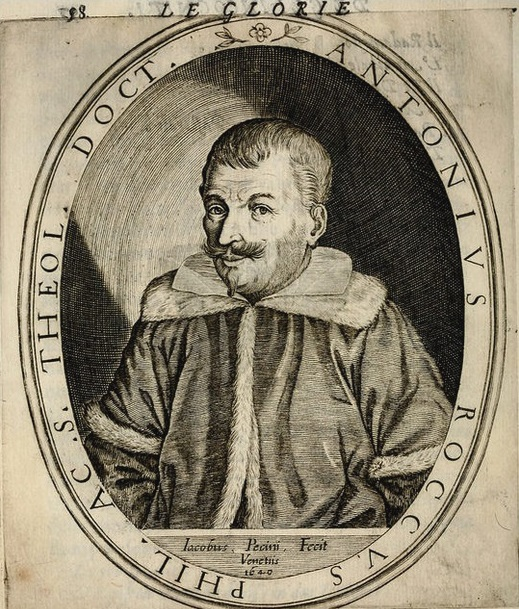
Philosopher Antonio Rocco (1586-1653)

Alcibiades the Schoolboy (L'Alcibiade, fanciullo a scola), an Italian dialogue published anonymously in 1652, is a defense of homosexual sodomy (anal sex) loosely styled after Socratic dialogues.

The dialogue depicts Socrates trying to consummate his pederastic relationship with his student Alcibiades. Part of the story is devoted to refuting the anti-homosexual arguments which were based on the biblical account of Sodom and Gomorrah. The text has been attributed to either Pietro Aretino or Antonio Rocco.

== Plot ==
Set in ancient Athens, the teacher is modelled on Socrates, who so desperately wants to consummate the relationship he has with Alcibiades, one of his students, that he uses all tactics of rhetoric and sophistry at his disposal. He argues that Nature gave us sexual organs for our own pleasure, and that it would insult her to use them otherwise, citing examples from Greek mythology and culture, as well as refuting counterarguments based on the Sodom and Gomorrah narrative. It is "a tour de force of pederastic fantasy and one of the frankest and most explicit texts on the subject to have been written before the twentieth century." It has been called "the first homosexual novel".

== Attribution to two different writers ==
For many years the identity of the author was a mystery. The work was first attributed to Pietro Aretino, but an article in 1888 by Achille Neri identified the author as Antonio Rocco, a libertine priest and philosopher and member of the Accademia degli Incogniti founded by Giovan Battista Loredan.

== Context within libertinism ==
The text is unashamedly explicit, and it has been argued that "it must be understood in the context of similar texts of the trend of libertinism, using the term in its original sense of a skeptical philosophical tendency."

== Academic study on the text ==
The fullest discussion of Rocco's text is in James Grantham Turner, Schooling Sex: Libertine Literature and Erotic Education in Italy, France, and England, 1534-1685 (Oxford: Oxford University Press, 2003, 2009), chapter 2.

== Sources ==
=== Text and translations ===
==== English ====
- Translation into English by Laura T. de Summa The Philosophical Forum, volume 42, issue 4, 2011, pp. 497–506.
- Translation into English by J. C. Rawnsley with an afterword by Don Mader, Amsterdam: Entimos Press, 2000.

==== French ====
- Gustave Brunet, Dissertation sur L'Alcibiade fanciullo a scola, including French translation by Giovanni Battista Baseggio. Facsimile reprint available as book-on-demand from Kessinger, 2010 ISBN 1167419006.
- Unsigned "Preface to the 1891 French edition", http://www.williamapercy.com/wiki/images/Alchibiades_Preface.pdf, retrieved 2014-09-01. The preface is signed "Brussels, 1891", so the "1891 French edition" is apparently that published with the imprint (very possibly false) of Brussels. Many notes prefixed "JCR" (J. C. Rawnsley), including n. 2, which says "at the time of writing (July, 2000)".

=== Secondary material ===
- "Rocco, Antonio (1586-1653)". glbtq.com. Archived from the original on 18 December 2014.
- Giovanni Dall'Orto, "Antonio Rocco and the Background of His 'L'Alcibiade fanciullo a Scola' (1652)," Among Men, Among Women, Amsterdam: University, 1983, pp. 224–32.
- Diederik Janssen, "Alcibiades the Schoolboy Redux, or the Impossibility of Childhood Sexuality", International Journal of Sexual Health, 23, no. 3 2011, pp. 158–160.
