= Antonio Rocco =

Italian priest, philosopher, and writer

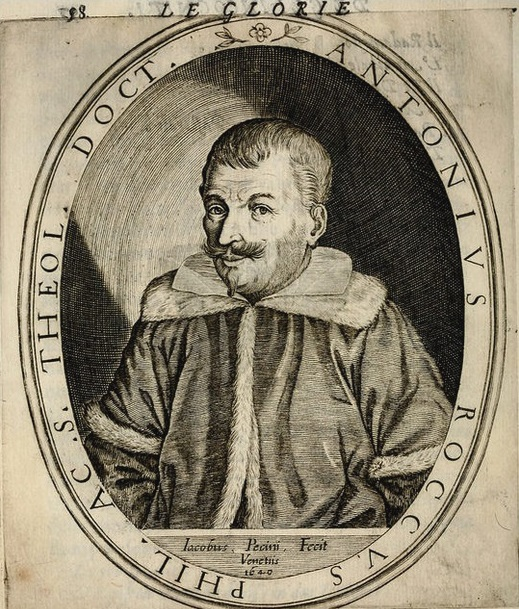
Portrait of the Italian philosophy teacher and a writer Antonio Rocco (1586–1653) by Jacopo Pecini, from the book, Le glorie degli Incogniti, 1647

Antonio Rocco (1586–1653) was an Italian priest and philosophy teacher (he graduated under Cesare Cremonini), and a writer. Ever since 1888, when he was identified as its anonymous author, he is best known for his satirical pederastic dialogue, L'Alcibiade, fanciullo a scola, written in 1630 and published in 1652.

The work was immediately suppressed, and only ten copies survived the attempts to destroy the whole print run. The survival of the work led, in 1862, to its translation and publishing in Italian. Again the work elicited immediate condemnation. It was denounced by the police as a liber spurcissimus (a most filthy book) and largely destroyed.

== Bibliography ==
- In universam philosophiam naturalem Aristotelis paraphrasis textualis exactissima; necnon quaestiones omnes desiderabiles ad mentem Joannis Duns Scoti subtilis, Varisco, Venezia 1623.
- In Aristotelis Logicam paraphrasis textualis, & quaestiones ad mentem Scoti. Una cum introductione in principio, & tractatu de secundis intentionibus, Varisco, Venezia 1627.
- Esercitationi filosofiche di d. Antonio Rocco filosofo peripatetico. Le quali versano in considerare le positioni, & obiettioni, che si contengono nel Dialogo del signor Galileo Galilei Linceo contro la dottrina d'Aristotile, Francesco Baba, Venezia 1633.
- Animae rationalis immortalitas simul cum ipsius vera propagatione ex semine, via quadam sublimi peripatetica, non hactenus post Aristotelem signata vestigijs, exercitationis philosophicae illibataeque veritatis gratia indagatur ab Antonio Rocco. Philosophicorum operum tomus sextus, Philip Hertz, Francofurti 1644.
- D.P.A., L'Alcibiade fanciullo a scola, no date and publisher, but 1651. Also as: Antonio Rocco, L'Alcibiade fanciullo a scola, Salerno, Roma 1988 e 2003 (critical edition by Laura Coci).
- De Scurcula Marsorum... In logicam, atque universam naturalem philosophiam Aristoteles paraphrasis textualis exactissima; nec non quaestiones desiderabilis ad mentem Joannis Duns Scoti doctoris subtilis. Quod quidem opus est lectura eiusdem Antonij habita in florentissima Academia Peripateticorum Innouatorum Venetijs, Francesco Baba, Venezia 1654
- Facultas rationalis sive logica universa in duas partes distributa, et ad usum studiosae iuventutis ordinata, Venetiis, apud Franciscum Salerni, & Ioannem Cagnolini, 1668.
- Della bruttezza; Amore è un puro interesse (edited by F. Walter Lupi), ETS, Pisa 1990.
- Eduardo Melfi, Figure della mancanza: il discorso "Della Bruttezza" di Antonio Rocco, in G. Nocera (editor), Il segno barocco (Atti del congresso, Siracusa, 17-19 dicembre 1981), Bulzoni, Roma, 1983, pp. 263–278.
- Giovanni Dall'Orto, Antonio Rocco and the background of his "L'Alcibiade fanciullo a scola". In: "Among men, among women", Amsterdam, 22-26/6/1983, pp. 224–232.
- Aldrich R. & Wotherspoon G., Who's Who in Gay and Lesbian History, from Antiquity to WWII, Routledge, London, 2001.
