= Province of Alagoas =

Former territorial division in Brazil

Province of Alagoas Province of the United Kingdom of Portugal, Brazil and the Algarves (1821-1822) Province of the Empire of Brazil (1822-1889)
- Merchant ensign

- Capital: Maceió; 9°39′S 35°44′W
- Official languages: Portuguese
- Religion: Catholicism
- Government: Constitutional monarchy
- President of Province
  - 1822: José António Ferreira Brak-Lamy (first)
  - 1889: Pedro Ribeiro Moreira (last)

Establishment
  - Change from Captaincy to Province: 1821
  - Proclamation of the Republic: 1889
- Currency: réis

The Province of Alagoas was part of the United Kingdom of Portugal, Brazil and the Algarves, and later of the Empire of Brazil, being created after the Captaincy of Alagoas.

== History ==
=== Creation of the comarca ===
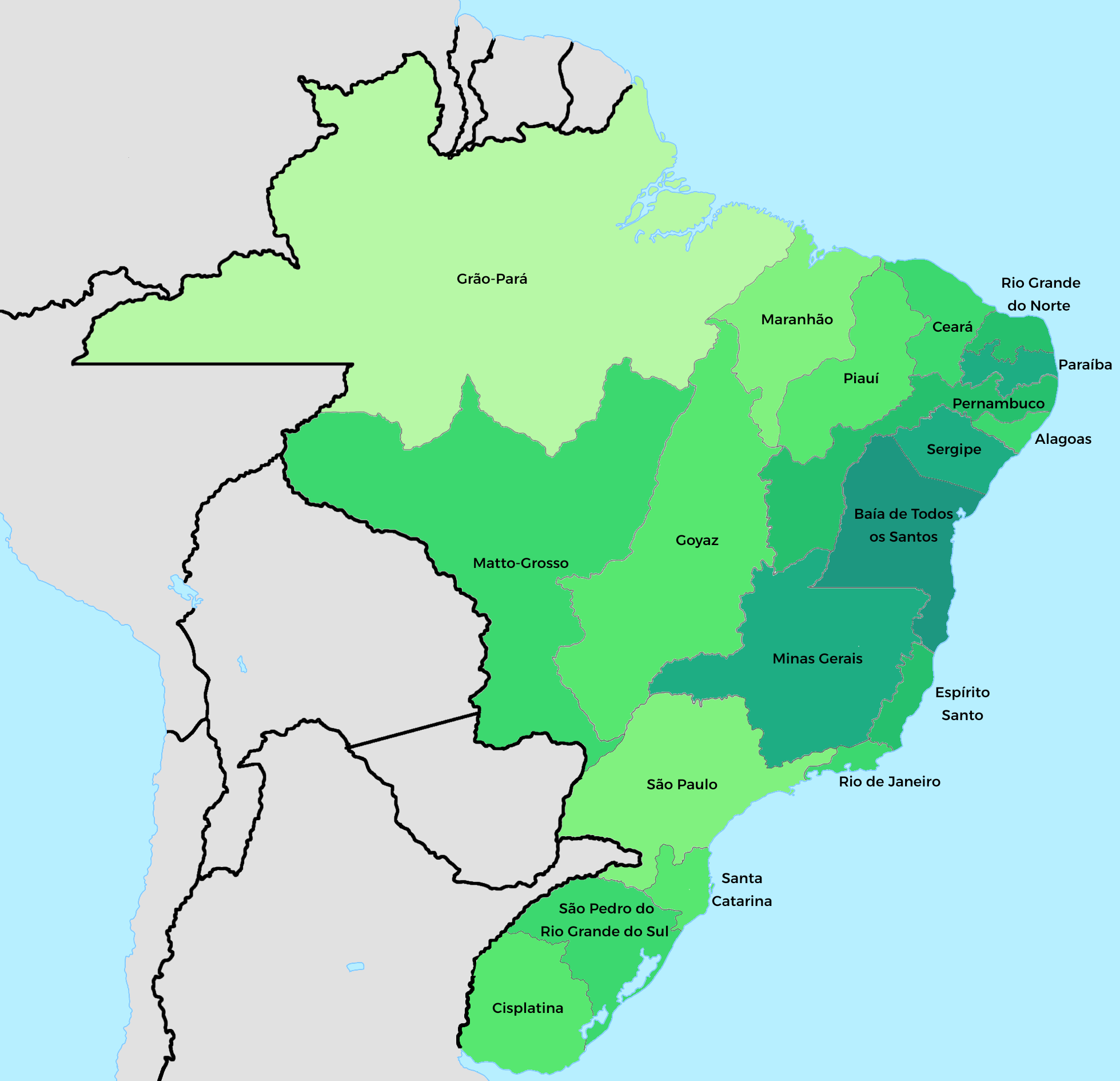
The Provinces of the Empire.

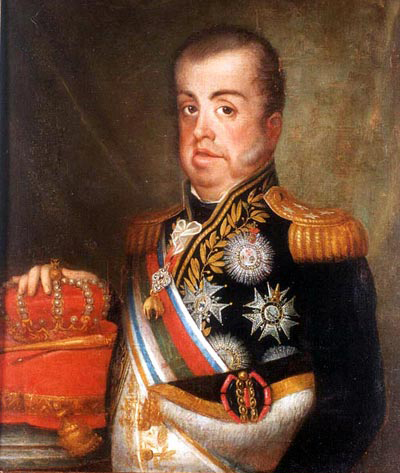
John VI of Portugal.

After the events of the Palmares War, Alagoas began to show evidence of prosperity and development, both economically and culturally. Its main wealth was sugar, and manioc, tobacco and corn were also produced, although on a smaller scale; hides, skins and brazilwood were exported. The abundant forests provided wood for the construction of ships. In the convents of Penedo and Alagoas (now Marechal Deodoro), the Franciscans held courses and published sermons and poetry. This context justified the royal act of October 9, 1710 that created the comarca of Alagoas, which was only established in 1711. From then on, the judicial organization restricted the feudal arbitrariness of the lords and the representatives of the metropolis; the comarca was developing. In 1730, the governor of Pernambuco, proposing to the king the extinction of the decadent captaincy of Paraíba, pointed out the prosperity of Alagoas, which already had almost fifty sugar cane mills, ten parishes, and considerable income for the royal treasury. Besides sugar, the cultivation of cotton, which was introduced in the 1770s, increased; in 1778, samples of cotton woven in Alagoas were already being exported to Lisbon. Ordinary cloth was manufactured, mainly for the use of slaves, in Penedo and Porto Calvo. In 1754, Friar João de Santa Ângela published his book of sermons and poetry in Lisbon; it is the first work by a man from Alagoas. The population was growing, distributed in various activities. A demographic calculation, ordered in 1816 by the Ombudsman Antônio Ferreira Batalha, registered a population of 89,589 people.

=== Independent Captaincy ===
Three years later, in 1819, a new census showed a population of 111,973 people. There were eight villages in the province, and Alagoas was already an independent captaincy from Pernambuco, created by the charter of September 16, 1817. The repercussion of the Pernambucan Revolt of that year contributed to facilitate the emancipation process. The ombudsman Batalha was the main mentor of the people of Alagoas. Taking advantage of the situation and breaking his own royal laws, he dismembered the region from Pernambuco's jurisdiction and established a provisional government there. These acts were enough to pave the way for Dom John to sanction the dismemberment. Sebastião Francisco de Melo e Póvoas, the appointed governor, did not take office until January 22, 1819.

From then on, Alagoas became more prosperous. On August 17, 1831, the Íris Alagoense, the first newspaper published in the province, was created. The first years of independence were not easy. A sequence of movements shook provincial life: in 1824, the Confederation of the Equator; in 1832–1835, the Cabanada; in 1844, the rebellion known as Lisos e Cabeludos; in 1849, the repercussions of the Praieira revolt.

=== Relocation of the capital ===
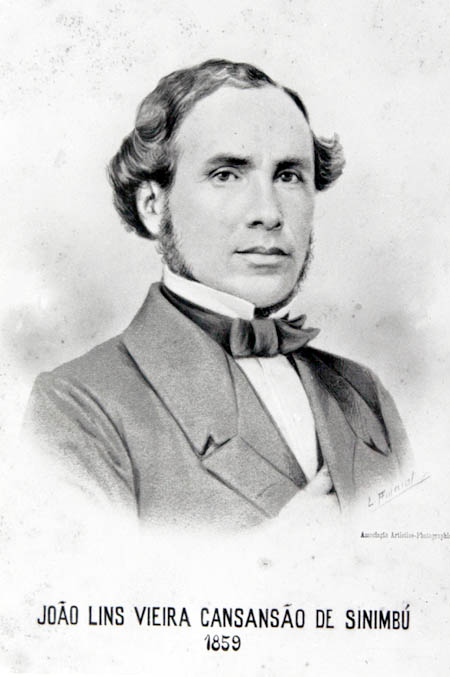
Viscount of Sinimbu.

In 1839, the capital, then located in the old city of Alagoas, was transferred to the town of Maceió, located by the sea, on the road between the north, center and south of the province. In the process of change, the two most important political factions clashed, one headed by the future Viscount of Sinimbu, the other by Judge Tavares Bastos, father of the future philosopher Tavares Bastos, born in 1839. At that time, the province had eight towns and, since 1835, the provincial assembly had been functioning.

The government of the province was succeeded by presidents appointed by the emperor who were not always interested in the destinies of the land and were sometimes involved in partisan fights. However, the province was progressing. In the economic field, it is worth mentioning the foundation, in 1857, of the União Mercantil Company, the first fabric factory in Alagoas, located in the Fernão Velho district and idealized by the Baron of Jaraguá, which contributed to the fomentation of the regional economy. Thirty years later, the Companhia Alagoana de Fiação e Tecidos was founded and installed in Rio Largo on October 15, 1888. Next, on September 30, 1892, the Companhia Progresso Alagoano was founded in same city.

Education received an incentive with the installation, in 1849, of the Liceu Alagoano, now State School of Alagoas, for the secondary level. Primary education, already benefited in 1864 by the establishment of a normal school, and which today operates under the name Instituto de Educação (English: Institute of Education), received a significant boost with the creation of new schools. In 1869, with the foundation of the Archeologic and Geographic Institute of Alagoas, today the Historic and Geographic Institute of Alagoas, historical and geographical studies were developed. From the end of the empire to the beginning of the republic, the movement for the construction of central mills and the technical improvement of sugar production increased, which would give rise to the sugar refinery; the first one was built during the republican period.

The abolitionist and republican movements of the last years of the monarchy would reach the province through the Sociedade Libertadora Alagoana and the newspapers Gutenberg and Lincoln. The abolitionist campaign mobilized the intellectuals of Alagoas, without, however, reaching the excesses of violence. Teachers and journalists attracted the youth to the campaign, and after the abolition, in 1888, it was Francisco Domingues da Silva who took the initiative to create a professional education institute for the children of former slaves.

=== Dissolution ===
The republican movement, intensified by the abolition, reflected itself in the activities of the press and propaganda clubs. The most important of these was the Centro Republicano Federalista, the oldest; others were the Clube Federal Republicano and the Clube Centro Popular Republicano Maceioense, both existing in the capital at the time of the proclamation. In the countryside, there were also other propaganda clubs. The Gutenberg was the most vehement press organ in spreading the republican idea.

On the same day that, in Rio de Janeiro, the republic was proclaimed, and in Maceió, Dr. Pedro Ribeiro Moreira, the last delegate of the imperial government for the province, assumed the presidency. Once the change of regime was confirmed, a governing board was organized, but on November 19, Marshal Deodoro appointed his brother, Pedro Paulino da Fonseca, to govern the new state. He was also the first governor elected after the state constitution was promulgated, on June 12, 1891.

== See also ==
- List of governors of Alagoas
- Provinces of Brazil
