= Tavares Bastos =

Tavares Bastos is the surname of a political family during the Empire of Brazil. It can refer to:

- Aureliano Cândido Tavares Bastos (1839-1875), Brazilian politician, writer and journalist
  - Tavares Bastos (favela), a favela (slum) in Rio de Janeiro, named after the politician
  - Rua Tavares Bastos, the main road to the Tavares Bastos favela
- José Tavares Bastos (1813-1893), Brazilian politician, and father of Aureliano Cândido Tavares Bastos
- Cassiano Cândido Tavares Bastos, Brazilian politician: brother of Aureliano Cândido Tavares Bastos, and son of José Tavares Bastos
