= Archeological, Historic and Geographic Institute of Pernambuco =

Research institute in Pernambuco, Brazil

Coordinates: 8°3′42″S 34°53′4″W

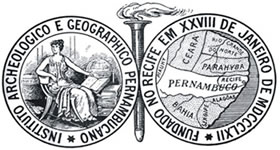
- IAHGP logo
- Former name: Instituto Archeológico
- Established: January 28, 1862
- Location: Recife, Pernambuco, Brazil
- Type: Regional historical institute
- Website: www.iahgp.com.br

The Archeological, Historic and Geographic Institute of Pernambuco (Portuguese: Instituto Arqueológico, Histórico e Geográfico Pernambucano, IAHGP) is an organization dedicated to promoting research and preserving the historical, geographic, cultural, and social sciences of the Brazilian state of Pernambuco. Located in the city of Recife, it was inaugurated on January 28, 1862. It is the oldest regional historical institute in Brazil and the second institution in the country dedicated to history, following the Brazilian Historic and Geographic Institute.

The organization safeguards memories of Pernambuco's past, including significant events such as the early wars in the state, like the Battle of Guararapes. It also preserves the broader historical heritage of Pernambuco. Among its collection is a copy of Preciso, the sole document printed by the rebels of the Pernambucan revolt. This document outlines the actions planned by the newly constituted government, along with the press used to produce it.

== History ==
The IAHGP traces its origins to criticisms of Emperor Pedro II during his visit to Recife in 1859. The emperor noted the neglect and indifference of Pernambuco's intellectuals toward the state's historical past. The institute was founded in 1862 by a group of progressive intellectuals, led by Joaquim Pires Machado Portella, becoming Brazil's first regional historical institute. Its first elected president was Monsignor Francisco Muniz Tavares.

Initially, the institute operated out of the Carmo Convent. In 1920, the institute moved permanently to its current location at 130, Hospício Street. The current headquarters, a two-story building with a wide entrance door, six windows on the ground floor, and seven windows with a belvedere on the upper floor, was donated by Governor Manoel Borba. The building underwent significant renovations to accommodate the institute's needs.

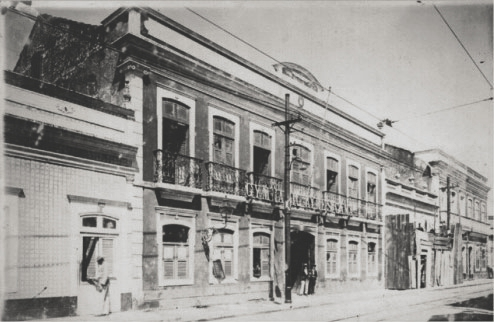
IAHGP headquarters.

The collection of the Pernambuco Archaeological, Historical, and Geographical Institute (IAHGP) includes documents and artifacts connected to the history and memory of Pernambuco. Its library contains approximately 25,000 volumes, including books, maps, and rare items, such as a copy of the Vingboons Atlas. The collection also features a stone column bearing the coat of arms that once marked the boundary between the captaincies of Pernambuco and Itamaracá, busts of Frei Caneca, oil portraits and paintings of historical figures like Maurício de Nassau, and objects such as the cup held by politician João Pessoa at the time of his assassination in Recife.

Over the years, the IAHGP has contributed to Recife's public spaces through initiatives such as installing bronze plaques that highlight the significance of monuments and locations. Members of the institute, including journalist and historian Mário Melo, have also been prominent contributors to Pernambuco’s press. In 2015, the IAHGP launched a project to install informational panels in the neighborhoods of Graças, Espinheiro, Boa Vista, and Santo Antônio. These tiled panels highlight eight historic streets in Recife, providing not only their names but also brief descriptions of their origins and meanings. The project is supported culturally and funded by sponsorships from companies and individuals.

The IAHGP holds its annual magna session on January 28th to commemorate the Restoration of Pernambuco. The institute’s entire collection is listed by the National Institute of Historic and Artistic Heritage (IPHAN).

== Institute Magazine ==
Since 1863, the Institute has published its journal, titled Revista do Instituto Arqueológico, Histórico e Geográfico de Pernambuco. The publication schedule was irregular until 1920. For a brief period, between 1920 and 1936, the journal was published biannually, with issues released in January and December.

== Celebrating 150 years ==
The 150th anniversary of the founding of the IAHGP was marked by a Magna session at the Santa Isabel Theater, a solemn mass at the Basilica of Our Lady of Mount Carmel, and a concert by the Pernambuco Conservatory of Music Orchestra at the Madre de Deus Cathedral. A solemn tribute to the IAHGP was held at the Joaquim Nabuco House, a venue used by the Legislative Assembly of Pernambuco (Alepe).

== Commemoration of the Bicentenary of the Pernambuco Revolt of 1817 ==
In 2017, the Archaeological, Historical, and Geographical Institute of Pernambuco (IAHGP), in partnership with the Pernambuco Academy of Letters (APL), held a formal session to commemorate the Bicentenary of the Pernambuco Revolution of 1817. The event, which featured free admission, included lectures delivered by academic Vamirech Chacon.

Additionally, in the same year, the IAHGP collaborated with the Museum of the City of Recife, located at the Forte das Cinco Pontas, a well-known tourist attraction in Pernambuco, to host an exhibition honoring the Pernambuco Revolution of 1817. Running from March 12 until the end of the year, the exhibition was organized into five thematic sections, or “axes,” aiming to depict life in Pernambuco during 1817 and to highlight the ideas that inspired the revolution.

== Works and parts ==
The museum houses several works and artifacts of historical significance to Pernambuco, including:

- A tombstone featuring the Portuguese coat of arms and crown, which marked the boundary between the captaincies of Pernambuco and Itamaracá.
- Busts of notable figures such as Frei Caneca, Oliveira Lima, Alfredo de Carvalho, and Mário Melo.
- The coat of arms of Duarte Coelho.
- The first printing press used by the Diário de Pernambuco.
- A Dutch bronze cannon.
- Portraits of prominent individuals, including Maurício de Nassau, Dom Pedro II, Bishop Azeredo Coutinho, Dom Vital, João Alfredo, and Count of Boa Vista.
- Panels depicting the First and Second Battles of Guararapes.
- A numismatic collection.
- Prints of Recife Antigo.
- 19th-century Pernambuco furniture.
- Rare manuscripts related to Pernambuco's history.
- Pillars from the Santo Antônio Arch, which was demolished.

== See also ==
- Brazilian Historic and Geographic Institute
- Historic and Geographic Institute of Alagoas
- Historic and Geographic Institute of Pará
