= Proposed federative units of Brazil =

Proposals for the creation of federative units in Brazil are currently under discussion and in different stages of processing in the National Congress. The creation of 18 new states and three new federal territories were officially proposed, which would bring the total number of federative units to 48. The region with the largest number of federative units would be the North region, while the South region would be the only one with a new federative unit. The states with the most advanced stage of creation are Gurgueia and Maranhão do Sul both in the Northeast region.

With a view to organizing and accelerating the debate and procedures in Congress, the Parliamentary Front on the Creation of New States and Territories was installed in 2003, on the initiative of federal deputies Ronaldo Dimas (PSDB -TO) and Sebastião Madeira (PSDB- MA). According to the proposal, this would be a mechanism to conduct the country's territorial division as a way of reducing socioeconomic inequalities and favoring the development of regions least assisted by the Public Power. The idea is to follow the successful example of the state of Tocantins. Projects in the North region were also submitted to the Amazon, National Integration and Regional Development Commission (CAINDR). If the projects are approved in Congress, the next step is to conduct a plebiscite among the residents of each state, with the coordination of the Superior Electoral Court. If approved at the polls, the proposal is forwarded to the Palácio do Planalto, so that the President of the Republic can send a complementary bill to Congress proposing the creation of the new unit.

The arguments unfavorable to the creation of new units focus on high costs, and, according to the artifice, they have political motivations. Tocantins, for example, cost the national coffers around R$1.2 billion. If all new units are approved, the total cost could reach R$20 billion. Expenses are generated by the installation of a seat of government, a legislative assembly, state secretariats, among others. In addition to the installation cost, it also creates an annual expense between salaries and costs that reaches R$30 million for each new state. Senators from each unit would also have an additional cost of R $150,000 in annual salaries alone.

== History ==
=== Colonial period ===
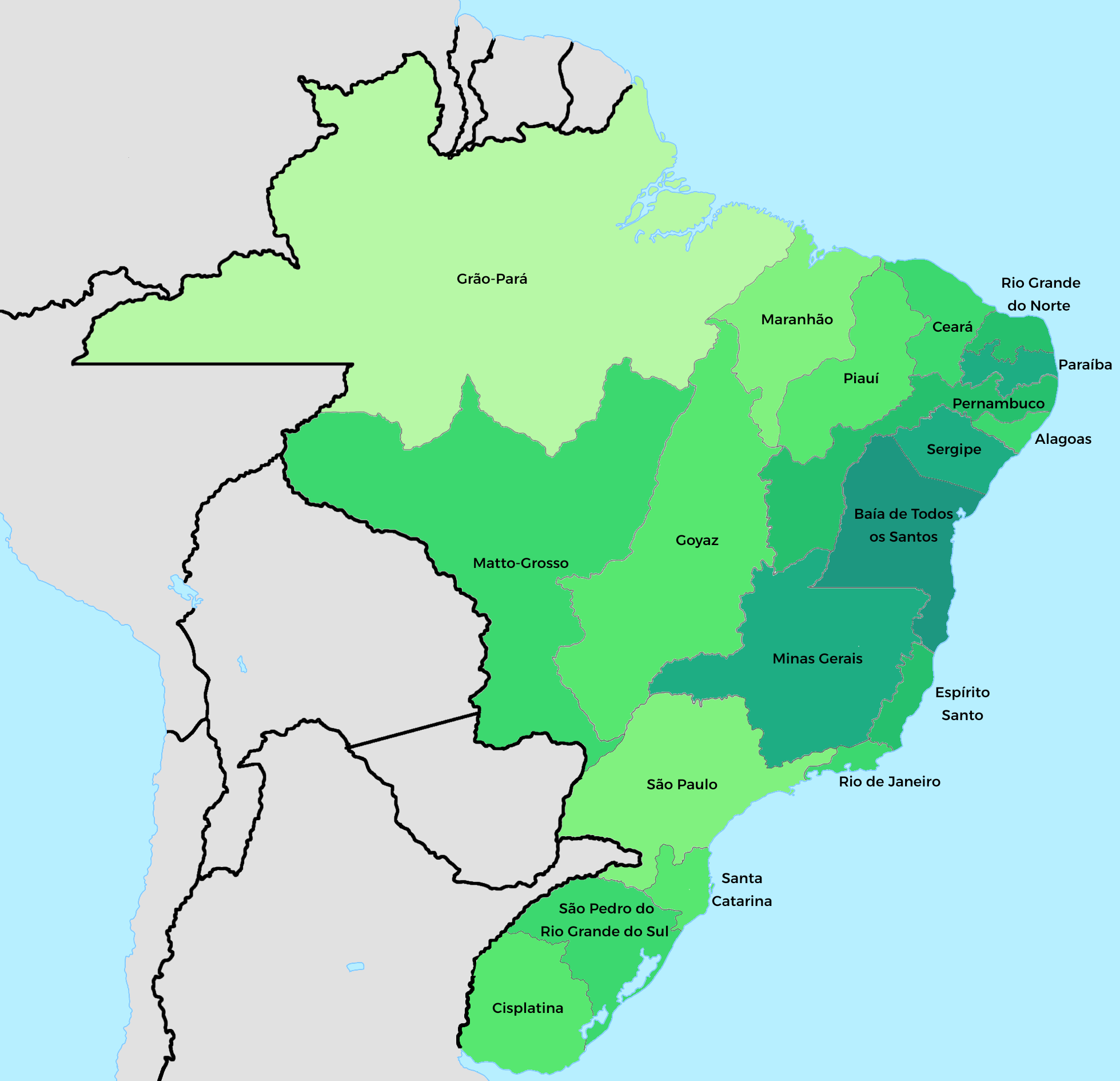
Provinces of the Empire of Brazil in 1822 .

The concept of creating new federation units is not new in Brazilian history. Since the Portuguese advanced through the portion of South America allocated to Castile by the Treaty of Tordesillas, leading to the signing of a new agreement, the Treaty of Madrid, the country's map has undergone several changes.

In the first decades of the 18th century, Brazil already had most of its current territory, but only seven captaincies-general: Grão-Pará, Maranhão, Pernambuco, Bahia, Rio de Janeiro, São Paulo and São Pedro.

At the end of the same century, several other captaincies existed as a result of the dismemberments of Pernambuco, Bahia and São Paulo, such as Minas Gerais, which separated from the Captaincy of São Paulo and Minas de Ouro, and Ceará, Paraíba and Rio Grande do Norte, disconnected from the Captaincy General of Pernambuco. In 1817, Pernambuco lost the District of Alagoas, as punishment for the Pernambucan Revolution, and the Captaincy of Alagoas was created by D. João VI. In 1820, D. João VI authorized the emancipation of the captaincy of Sergipe del-Rey.

=== Imperial period ===
==== Creations ====
Between 1821 and 1823 the province of São João da Palma was created and comprised the territories of the Brazilian state of Tocantins, at the time the captaincy of Goiás, and the southern portion of the captaincy of Grão-Pará . It was extinguished in 1823, with today Tocantins as its successor.

In 1850, Amazonas became an autonomous province, confirmed according to Law No. 582, of September 5, 1850, definitively separating from Grão-Pará, as a reward for its loyalty to the imperial government in not joining Cabanagem.

In 1853, the southern portion of the province of São Paulo was dismembered, creating Paraná, under Law nº 704, of August 8, 1853, as a reward for its loyalty to the imperial government in not joining the Farroupilha Revolution and the Liberal Revolt of 1842.

==== Proposals ====
In 1824, Pernambuco lost the District of Rio de São Francisco, a region on the left bank of the São Francisco River (currently West Bahia ), as punishment by the Confederation of Ecuador. In 1850, 5 signatories, including the Baron of Cotegipe, signed the fourth project to create the province of Rio São Francisco, a project sought by its residents to this day. Since the dismemberment, there have been 8 unsuccessful attempts (1823, 1830, 1850, 1856, 1857, 1873, 1987 and 2011) to establish an autonomous political-administrative unit in western Bahia.

===== 1853 =====
In 1853, a bill was proposed by Senator Cândido Mendes for the creation of the province of Oyapóckia, on the border of the extreme north of Brazil as the capital would be Macapá . This project was initially rejected. In 1873, Cândido Mendes returned with the project, changing the name to Pinsônia Province, both a reference to how the Oiapoque river was known (Vicente Pinzón river), and in honor of the navigator Vincente Pinzón, discoverer of its mouth.

===== 1856 =====
In 1856, deputy Antônio Gabriel de Paula Fonseca presented a bill to the General Assembly proposing the creation of the province of Minas Novas, also called Arassuaí. According to the project presented, it would cover part of the territory of the south of Bahia and the north-northeast of Minas Gerais, with the capital being the former Vila do Bom Sucesso das Minas Novas do Araçuaí, also known as Vila do Fanado, today Minas Novas. Currently, the proposal to create the state of Minas do Norte is seen as its successor.

===== 1873 =====
In 1873, the Viscount of Serro Frio, presented to the General Assembly his Project for a New Administrative Division of the Empire of Brazil, in this proposal the creation of the province of Rio São Francisco was presented for the fifth time, in addition to other subdivisions, proposing the creation of the provinces of Januária, Santa Cruz, Entre Rios, Sapucahy and Araguaya. If the project had been approved, the southwest and south of Minas Gerais plus part of the western, northern and northeastern territory of São Paulo would give way to the Sapucahy Province (which would also include part of the southern coast of Rio de Janeiro); part of Goiás plus the Triângulo and western Minas Gerais would constitute the province of Entre Rios; the northwest and part of the north of Minas Gerais would be the province of Januária; territories that today form Tocantins and the south of the states of Maranhão and Piauí would form the province of Araguaia; while the northeast of Minas Gerais would give way to the province of Santa Cruz together with the coast of Bahia and Espírito Santo between Ilhéus and São Mateus. The same project would also redefine the territories of Espírito Santo and Piauí . Today, the project to create the state of Triângulo is seen as its successor to the old province of Entre Rios. Currently, the proposal to create the state of Santa Cruz, in Bahia, has as its predecessor this project presented by the viscount of Serro Frio in 1873. The more recent project to create the state of Araguaia in Mato Grosso should not be confused with the homonymous province proposed in 1873, as they are in different areas, on opposite banks of the river that names the projects.

===== 1880 =====
In 1880, Major Augusto Fausto de Souza prepared the map called Empire of Brazil divided into 40 Provinces, presenting it to the Brazilian Historical and Geographic Institute, of which he was a member. In it he proposes the creation of the provinces of Tapajós, Madeira, Solimões, Japurá, Araguaya-Xingu and Tocantins in the North Region, in addition to reinforcing the need to create the province of Pinsônia. In the Central-West Region, he proposed the creation of the provinces of Diamantina and Amambay. In the Southeast Region, he proposed the provinces of Tietê, Minas do Sul and Paracatu. In the Northeast Region, he proposed the provinces of Urussuhy, Tury Assu, Ilhéus, Porto Seguro, in addition to reinforcing the creation of the province of Rio São Francisco. And in the South Region, he proposed the creation of the province of Uruguay.

===== 1887 =====
In 1887, the project to create the province of Rio Sapucaí, also called Minas do Sul, was again presented to the General Assembly by senator Joaquim Floriano de Godoy, which would separate the south of Minas Gerais and the north of São Paulo. His idea was presented in his book entitled "Project of Law for the creation of the Sapucahy River Province".

=== Republican period ===
In 1943, with Brazil's entry into the Second World War, the government of Getúlio Vargas decided to separate six strategic border territories from the country to administer them directly: Ponta Porã, Iguaçu, Amapá, Rio Branco, Guaporé and the archipelago of Fernando de Noronha. Ponta Porã and Iguaçu return to their original condition after the war, while the remaining four are maintained (Rio Branco is renamed Roraima and Guaporé is named Rondônia in honor of Marshal Rondon).

In 1960, a quadrangular territory was separated from the state of Goiás, on the border with the state of Minas Gerais, to house the country's new capital, Brasília, which was based in the new Federal District. Simultaneously, the territory of the former Federal District was transformed into the state of Guanabara, comprising only the city of Rio de Janeiro and its rural area. In 1975, the state of Guanabara was incorporated into the state of Rio de Janeiro and the city of Rio de Janeiro became its capital. In 1977, the southern portion of Mato Grosso was emancipated as the new state of Mato Grosso do Sul with the city of Campo Grande as its capital. In 1978, proposition PLP-194 of the Chamber of Deputies foresees the creation of the state of Santa Cruz, separated from the territories of Minas Gerais and Bahia. The following year the proposal was rejected by the board of directors and archived. On December 22, 1981, the state of Rondônia was created and installed on January 4, 1982, with the city of Porto Velho as its capital. Rondônia was the only state where there was no election for governor in 1982, when, after 16 years, Brazilian voters returned to electing their state governors by direct vote (in the years 1970, 1974 and 1978, state governors were elected by the Legislative Assemblies of the respective states).

The 1988 Constitution left the division structure as it is today. Despite maintaining the legal definition of Federal Territories, it ended those existing until then, elevating Roraima and Amapá to the status of states and integrating Fernando de Noronha into the state of Pernambuco . In the same act, the northern portion of Goiás was separated into the state of Tocantins, with the city of Palmas as its capital (article 13 of the Transitional Constitutional Provisions Act).

The first governor of Tocantins was Siqueira Campos, elected by direct popular vote on November 15, 1988, 41 days after the promulgation of the current Constitution. He governed the state during a buffer term from January 1, 1989, to January 1, 1991, so that the elections in Tocantins would coincide, from 1990 onwards, with the other state elections in Brazil, according to the constitutional provision. transitory. As for Roraima and Amapá, their governors would only have their governors elected for the first time by direct vote in 1990.

== Current active proposals ==
In Congress, other proposals for creating new states and territories were considered:

- State of Planalto Central, formed with parts of Goiás, Minas Gerais and the Federal District;
- State of Entorno, formed with parts of Goiás and Minas Gerais;
- State of Itiquira, formed with parts of Goiás;
- State of Juruá, separated from Amazonas, covering the Amazonian cities on the borders with Acre, which already had Eirunepé as its capital;
- State of Solimões, separated from Amazonas, covering the border areas with Peru and Colombia and the capital would be Tabatinga.
- State of Araguaia, to be separated from northeastern Mato Grosso . The capital would be Barra do Garças;
- State of Mato Grosso do Norte, from the northwest of Mato Grosso, bordering Amazonas and Rondônia, the capital would be Juína;
- State of Pantanal, from the west of Mato Grosso do Sul, bordering Mato Grosso and Mato Grosso do Sul and would already be born with Corumbá as its capital;
- State of São Paulo do Sul, which would include 54 municipalities in the southern region of the state of São Paulo, one of the poorest regions in the state. Registry would be the capital. (already rejected in the Chamber's CCJ).
- State of Iguaçu, in the west of the states of Paraná and Santa Catarina. Its territory would be the same as the extinct Territory of Iguaçu, created in 1943 by then President Getúlio Vargas and extinguished in 1946;
- In addition to the Federal Territories of Marajó, in Pará; Alto Rio Negro, which is the ancient region known as Cabeça do Cachorro, in the northwest of Amazonas; and Oiapoque, in Amapá.

=== Carajás ===
If the bill is approved, it would be the result of the dismemberment of Pará. If Carajás, in the southeast of Pará, left the drawing board, it would have a population of 1.3 million inhabitants. It would have an area of 289,799 km^{2}, a third of the current state of Pará. It would be the ninth largest state in this regard, with 39 municipalities and 18% of Pará's voters. It would be larger than countries like Portugal, Uruguay and Ecuador. Only 11.04% of its population are from Pará. Maranhenses are 23.08% and Minas Gerais, 11.17%. The rest of the population migrated from all over Brazil. The plebiscite proposal was approved by the Chamber of Deputies on May 5, 2011. The plebiscite that would decide whether the state of Carajás would, in fact, be created or not, was held on December 11, 2011.

- Plebiscite project: Federal Senate PDS 00052 / 2007 of 03/20/2007

=== Tapajós ===
The state of Tapajós is a proposal resulting from the dismemberment of an area in the northwest and west of Pará. If Tapajós were to come to fruition, it would be the 4th largest Brazilian state, with 27 municipalities, headquartered in Santarém; would already be born with a GDP greater than R$5 billion.

On May 5, 2011, the plenary of the Chamber of Deputies approved the project calling for a plebiscite on the division of Pará to create Carajás and Tapajós. In the plebiscite on the creation of the new state, provided for in PDC 2300/09, citizens of the municipalities that would make up the new state were consulted. The approved project also set a deadline of two months for the Legislative Assembly of Pará to make a statement. The plebiscite was held by the Regional Court of Pará, after the promulgation of the rules. If approved, it would go to Congress to vote on a complementary law. The plebiscite that decided whether the state of Tapajós would, in fact, be created or not, took place on December 11, 2011.

=== São Francisco River ===
The State of Rio São Francisco would be formed from a part of Bahia, to the west of the homonymous river and its proposal was rejected in the Chamber's CCJ.

=== Gurgueia ===
The state of Gurgueia, with 87 municipalities, would be separated from the state of Piauí to the southeast and was named after the Gurgueia River. Once created, the new state would have an area of 155,568 km^{2}, that is, 61.85% of the total area of the current state of Piauí. In its territory, around 645,296 inhabitants would live, around 21.46% of the state population. The capital of the new state would be the city of Alvorada do Gurgueia. It would also already have a federal university, the Federal University of Vale do Gurgueia (UVG), based in the city of Bom Jesus, already in the process of being approved by Congress, as a spin-off from the Federal University of Piauí. The region is considered fertile for agriculture. Divided into two, Piauí would still be larger than seven states and Gurgueia, larger than twelve. In 2005 data, Gurgueia would be the poorest state in the country, with a per capita income of R$71.92 and the only state in the Northeast Region without a sea coast next to Maranhão do Sul, if such project was approved.

It had a plebiscite approved in 2006 by the Constitution and Justice Committee of the Chamber and presented in the plenary, awaiting a vote. In the Senate, it also awaits a vote in the plenary. Approved in the plenary in both houses, it will have a period of up to 3 years for its execution by the Regional Electoral Court of Piauí. The idea has popular and political support within other regions of Piauí.

- Plebiscite project: in the Federal Senate PDS 00055/2007 of 04/09/2007 and in the Chamber PDL 439/1994 of 06/30/1994

=== Maranhão do Sul ===
With open and organized support from Freemasonry and the local political elite, and even from the government, approval of the plebiscite took place in the Senate in 2007. Made up of the southern portions of the state of Maranhão, there is also discussion about what the new capital would be. The most likely locations are the cities of Imperatriz, Açailândia, Barra do Corda and Balsas, although some opinions are in favor of creating a new city for this purpose.

=== Triângulo ===
The state of Triângulo, with 66 municipalities, would be the result of the dismemberment of the western part of Minas Gerais and was named after the mesoregion of Triângulo Mineiro . If created, the new state will have an area of 90,545 km^{2}. In its territory, around 2,159,047 inhabitants would live, around 11% of the current state's population. The capital of the new state would be the city of Uberlândia, which currently has 600,285 inhabitants (IBGE /2010) and would already be larger than nine Brazilian capitals and would represent around 28% of the population of the Triangle. The new state would already have two federal universities, the Federal University of Uberlândia (UFU), based in the city of Uberlândia, and the Federal University of Triângulo Mineiro (UFTM), based in the city of Uberaba, both already established in the region. The proposed region would be considered to have one of the best social indexes in the country. In 2006 data, the Triângulo would be one of the richest states in the country, in proportion, with a GDP of more than R$33,127,886,000.00, which corresponds to approximately 17% of the GDP of Minas Gerais.

The plebiscite on the subject was approved in early 2008 by the Amazon, National Integration and Regional Development Commission and awaits the full opinion of the Constitution, Justice and Citizenship Commission. From there it goes to the Senate, where it will await a vote in the plenary.

- Plebiscite project: Chamber PDC 570/2008 of 5/20/2008

=== Proposals to change the status of metropolitan regions ===
There are also proposals to transform the country's main metropolitan regions into independent states, which would be administered separately from the current states to which they belong. This is a discussion that involves both political scientists and jurists, who argue that this process could be implemented in different ways, both with the transformation of these metropolitan regions into states, and with the creation of a fourth type of federated unit, in addition to the three levels currently existing (Union, state and municipality).

== Criticism of changes and opposing proposals ==
Geographer André Roberto Martin (FFLCH-USP) opposes any and all proposals for the creation of states, highlighting that those who make them are not based on concrete studies, popular will and even seem to favor certain groups. The author sees not in the creation, but in the merger of states, relief from administrative problems. In his doctoral thesis, he suggests that Amazonas and Roraima, Pará and Amapá, Goiás and Tocantins, Mato Grosso and Mato Grosso do Sul, Maranhão and Piauí, Bahia and Sergipe, Rio de Janeiro and Espírito Santo and — for what he calls "Pernambuco recovery" — Rio Grande do Norte, Paraíba, Pernambuco and Alagoas, while Acre and Rondônia — in addition to a portion of Amazonas — would become federal territories.

Martin points out that the partition of Pernambuco resulted in its decline. Whenever an uprising arose, the Crown fragmented the unit, generating a mosaic of barely viable territories. Regrouping the units into a single body would certainly boost their projection within the national framework and would even reduce government spending — given that there would now only be one Executive and one Legislative branch. A similar thing would happen with the other states.

Additionally, none of the new states emerged according to popular desires. Tocantins, Mato Grosso do Sul, Acre, Roraima, Amapá and Rondônia were all born unilaterally and for the benefit of thin social strata, averse to anything that was not in their interest, and it denounces that the majority of proposals follow this same line, when they do not follow that of simple naivety.
