= Captaincy of Alagoas =

Former territorial division of Brazil (1817–1821)

Captaincy of Alagoas Capitania de Alagoas
- 1817–1821
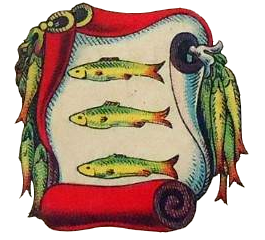
- Coat of arms of Alagoas.
- Status: Dependent territory
- Capital: Santa Maria Madalena da Lagoa do Sul
- Official languages: Portuguese
- Religion: Catholicism

Government
  - Governor: José Inácio Borges (first); Sebastião Francisco de Melo e Póvoas (last)

Establishment
  - Creation: September 16, 1817
- Today part of: Brazil

The Captaincy of Alagoas (Portuguese: Capitania de Alagoas) was created on September 16, 1817, by the dismemberment of the Captaincy of Pernambuco. The capital was located in the current city of Marechal Deodoro under the name of Santa Maria Madalena da Lagoa do Sul.

== History ==
The coast of the current state of Alagoas was reached by Portuguese navigators in 1501. At the time, it became a target for European brazilwood smugglers. In 1534, after the Portuguese Crown established the Hereditary Captaincy system for the colonization of Brazil, the territory of Alagoas became part of the Captaincy of Pernambuco. Its occupation dates back to the foundation of the town of Penedo in 1545 by the donatário Duarte Coelho Pereira, located on the banks of the São Francisco River, and to the establishment of sugar mills by the German Cristóvão Lins in the southern region of the territory.

In 1556, the site witnessed the sinking of the ship Nossa Senhora da Ajuda and the massacre of the survivors, including the bishop Dom Pero Fernandes Sardinha, by the Caeté people. The episode provided motivation for the war of extermination waged against the indigenous people by the Portuguese Crown. At the beginning of the 17th century, the Alagoas region produced a significant amount of sugar cane, manioc flour, tobacco, cattle and dried fish. During the second Dutch invasion of Brazil, the coast became the scene of violent fighting. Inland, the quilombos established by Africans escaping from the mills of Pernambuco and Bahia proliferated. Palmares, the most famous, numbered 20,000 people. In 1711, the territory became the Comarca of Alagoas, still subordinate to Pernambuco.

On September 16, 1817, after the Pernambuco Revolution, Alagoas achieved independence. The first governor, Sebastião Francisco de Melo e Póvoas, took office on January 22, 1819. The first capital was established in the town of Santa Maria Madalena da Lagoa do Sul, later called Alagoas (now Marechal Deodoro). On February 28, 1821, it became a province. During the Empire, it suffered the effects of movements such as the Confederation of the Equator and the Cabanada. The Provincial Law of December 9, 1839, transferred the capital of the province from the city of Alagoas to the village of Maceió, which was elevated to city status. In 1889, after the Proclamation of the Republic, it became a state.

== See also ==
- Captaincies of Brazil
- History of Alagoas
