= Historic and Geographic Institute of Alagoas =

Brazilian organization

Coordinates: 9.6620°S 35.7374°W

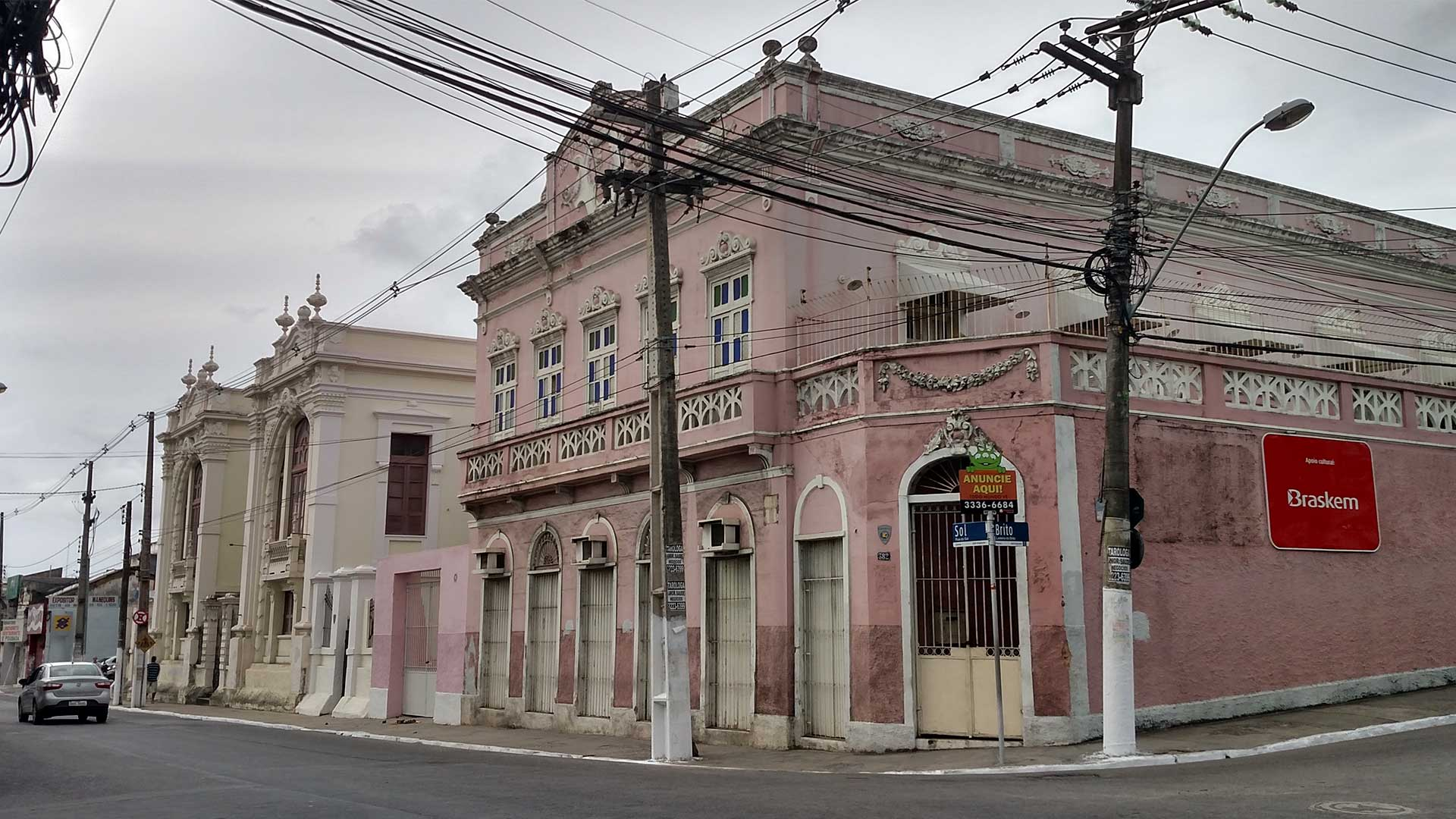

The Historic and Geographic Institute of Alagoas - IHGAL (Portuguese: Instituto Histórico e Geográfico de Alagoas) is a civil organization dedicated to the study and research in several fields of history, geography, and social sciences. It is located in downtown Maceió, in a building listed as a state heritage site. It was founded on December 2, 1869, and is the third oldest institution of its kind in Brazil.

The Institute houses the most representative iconographic and documental collection on the history of Alagoas, besides archeological and ethnographic sets, works of art, hemerotheca, library, and archive. It keeps the Museum of the Historic and Geographic Institute of Alagoas, where part of the collection is permanently exhibited, and promotes colloquiums, courses and seminars, and holds regular musical presentations.

== History ==
The Historic and Geographic Institute of Alagoas was founded on December 2, 1869, being the third to be created in Brazil, preceded by the Brazilian Historic and Geographic Institute, in Rio de Janeiro, and the Archeological, Historic and Geographic Institute of Pernambuco, in Recife. Among the founding members were Silvério Fernandes de Araújo Jorge, Delfino Augusto Cavalcanti de Albuquerque, Joaquim José de Araújo, Roberto Calheiros de Melo, as well as other politicians, journalists, religious men and writers, led by the president of the province of Alagoas, José Bento da Cunha Figueiredo Júnior.

At first, the IHGAL was installed in the Liceu Alagoano, the first official establishment of secondary education in Alagoas, founded in 1849. The Institute fostered historical, anthropological and geographical research, filling in part the gap left by the absence of higher education institutions in the province, which would only be created in the mid-20th century. In the following decades, it managed to gather an expressive historical, ethnographic and archeological collection through donations and acquisitions.

Currently, the institute is located in a large house from the late 19th century, which belonged to Américo Passos Guimarães. The property was expropriated by the state government in 1909 and given to IGHAL some time later. It has been listed by the historical heritage of Alagoas since 1998.

== Collection ==
The Historic and Geographic Institute of Alagoas keeps the most important collection related to the state's history. It preserves pieces from the old sugar mills, documents and objects related to slavery, the abolitionist movement, and the Quilombo dos Palmares, belongings of Lampião and Maria Bonita, which are part of the Cangaço Cycle collection, furniture and Masonic relics from the First Reign, and other items for private use that belonged to prominent personalities born in the state, such as Deodoro da Fonseca, Brazil's first president. It also has a valuable collection of materials used in the Paraguayan War, as well as weapons from the Bandeirantes period, and Dutch, French and Portuguese cannons.

In the archaeological segment, a rare collection of Marajoaras ceramics stands out, with 191 pieces donated by Jonas Montenegro, in addition to the Mário Marroquim Collection, composed of lithic materials collected in cities such as Porto Calvo and Rio Largo, probably produced by the Aratu culture. The ethnographic segment has approximately 500 artifacts from indigenous groups in the region. There is also a section dedicated to Afro-Brazilian religions and the Perseverance Collection, composed of documents referring to the Quebra de Xangô, a massacre promoted by a private militia in the Afro-Brazilian Temples in Maceió, which took place in 1912.

The institute also has a library specialized in history, with around 16 thousand volumes, six thousand of which are considered rare. Its newspaper library has thousands of issues of 79 newspaper titles published in Alagoas and in Brazil, while the map library has 228 copies and a large photo library. The pinacotheca has historical works, as well as landscapes and portraits by artists from Alagoas, Brazil and abroad.

== See also ==
- Brazilian Historic and Geographic Institute
