= João Lins Cansanção, Viscount of Sinimbu =

Brazilian politician

Viscount of Sinimbu
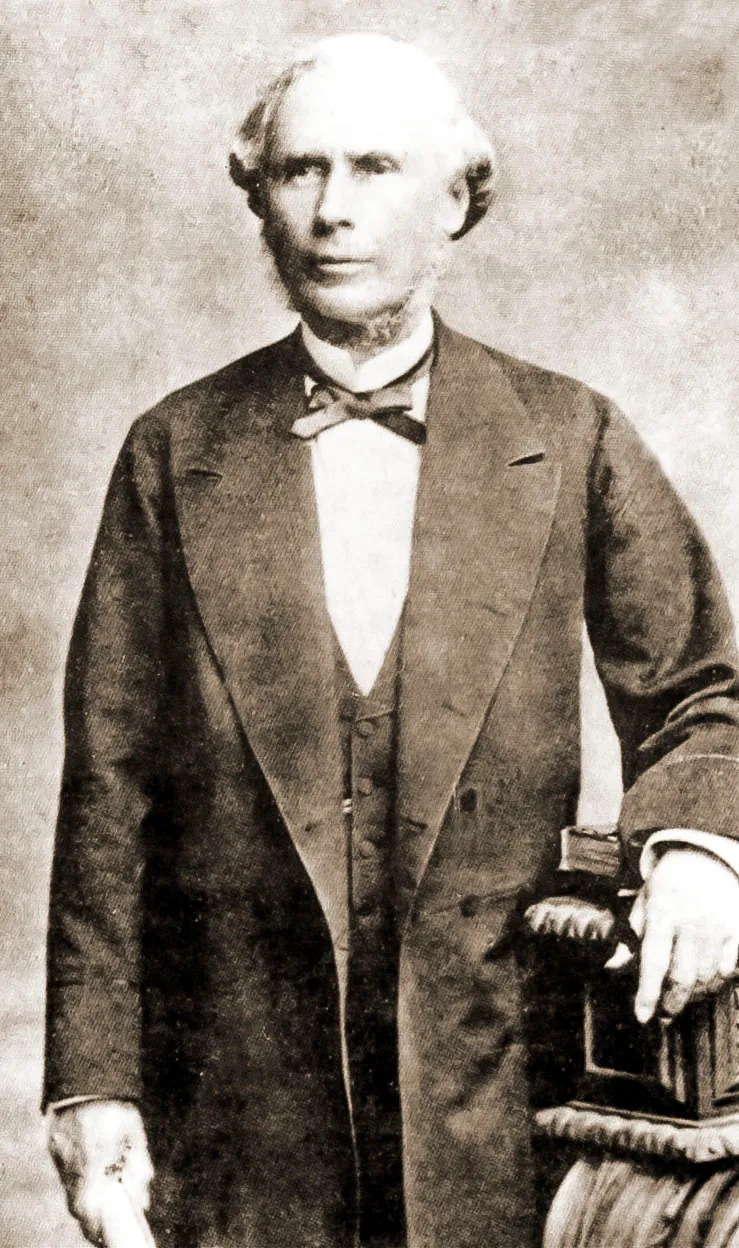
- The Viscount of Sinimbu, c. 1874

Prime Minister of Brazil
- In office 5 January 1878 – 28 March 1880
- Monarch: Pedro II
- Preceded by: Duke of Caxias
- Succeeded by: José Antônio Saraiva

Personal details
- Born: 20 November 1810 São Miguel dos Campos, Alagoas, Colonial Brazil
- Died: 27 December 1906 (aged 96) Rio de Janeiro, Rio de Janeiro, United States of Brazil
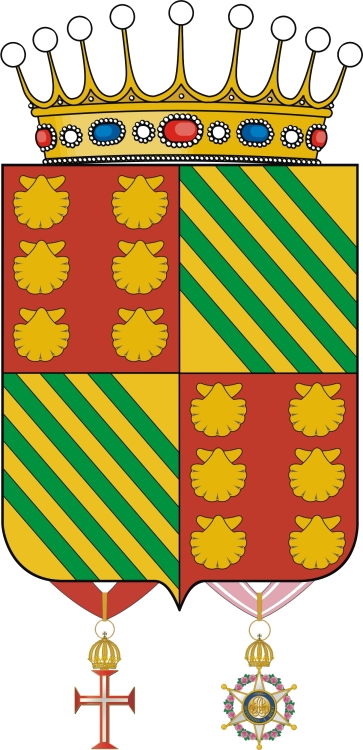
- Coat of Arms of the Viscount of Sinimbu

João Lins Vieira Cansanção de Sinimbu, Viscount of Sinimbu (20 November 1810 – 27 December 1906) was a Brazilian politician. He was President of the Council of Ministers from 5 January 1878 until 28 March 1880. He served as the President of the Senate from 1887 to 1888.

== Biography ==
He was the son of captain-major Manuel Vieira Dantas and Ana Maria José Lins, born on the Sinimbu engenho, in São Miguel dos Campos, Captaincy of Pernambuco (current state of Alagoas). Sinimbu studied law at the Olinda Juridical Academy and then continued his education in Europe, where he excelled in legal medicine and chemistry studies in Paris and obtained a doctorate at the University of Jena in Germany.

Upon returning to Brazil, Sinimbu began his political career, serving in various positions, including judiciary, police and diplomacy. He presided over the provinces of Alagoas and Sergipe, as well as serving as Brazil's resident minister in Montevideo. Sinimbu also held ministerial positions, including Minister of Foreign Affairs and Minister of Agriculture, Commerce and Public Works.

He stood out for introducing the decimal numeral system in Brazil during his tenure at the Ministry of Agriculture. Furthermore, he presided over the 27th Council of State and faced the Vintém Revolt, which arose due to popular discontent with tax increases.

Sinimbu was appointed senator of the Province of Alagoas in 1856 and remained in that position until the Proclamation of the Republic. Before that, he had been deputy general and provincial deputy in his home state. His political career was marked by a series of notable achievements, standing out in positions of significant importance in the political history of Brazil.
