= Brazilian Historic and Geographic Institute =

Research institute of Brazil

Coordinates: 22.9144°S 43.1767°W

Brazilian Historic and Geographic Institute Instituto Histórico e Geográfico Brasileiro
- Abbreviation: IHGB
- Formation: 21 October 1838 (188 years ago)
- Headquarters: Rio de Janeiro, Brazil
- Location: Augusto Severo Av. 8, Glória
- Official language: Brazilian portuguese
- President: Victorino Coutinho Chermont de Miranda
- Website: www.ihgb.org.br

The Brazilian Historic and Geographic Institute (Portuguese: Instituto Histórico e Geográfico Brasileiro, IHGB), founded on 21 October 1838, is the oldest and traditional authority to promote research and preservation of historical and geographical, cultural and social sciences in Brazil. Its creation, together with the Public Archives of Empire, which amounted to the Imperial Academy of Fine Arts, joined the effort of the conservatives during the regency of Pedro de Araújo Lima to build a strong and centralized imperial state.

== History ==
The institute was created in 1838, in an assembly of the Sociedade Auxiliadora da Indústria Nacional, by a proposal of Januário da Cunha Barbosa and marshal Raimundo José da Cunha Matos.

Its creation, together with the Public Archives of the Empire, which were added to the Imperial Academy of Fine Arts, integrated the effort of the conservatives for the construction of a strong and centralized imperial state. The IHGB was created with two central guidelines for its work: the collection and publication of documents relevant to the history of Brazil and the encouragement, for public education, of history studies.

The founding assembly was composed of twenty-seven founding members, most of whom, in addition to performing functions within the government, were part of a generation still born in Portugal, compulsorily transferred to Brazil on the occasion of the coming of King John VI to Brazil and educated in Coimbra, thus refractory to the ideals of the French Revolution. This group was dominant in the Institute and in government until the early 1850s, when it was replaced by the generation formed in Brazil. Being located in Rio de Janeiro, headquarters of the court, it was accredited to represent all of Brazil. It brought together in its cadres the cream of society and intellectuals of the time, bringing together local members (50 full members) and from other parts of the country and the world (an unlimited number of corresponding members).

The geography and history commissions were in charge of receiving memoirs, documents and articles, giving their opinion by indicating them to the magazine, to the single publication, or only to the archive.

In March 1839 it received the Patronage of the Emperor Pedro II, who besides being its protector, over time became an active member, presiding over hundreds of sessions. The link with the government was always strong, five years after its foundation, 75% of the IHGB's budget was covered by the government, a percentage that tended to be maintained during the 19th century.

Despite mirroring itself in Enlightenment agremiations, its agenda revolved around the sovereign, without him there was no show: in 1846, it did not celebrate the public anniversary session, as the emperor was out of Rio de Janeiro; in the 1865 magna session, the emperor's return to Rio de Janeiro, involved in the Paraguay War, was celebrated. Moreover it was customary for the Institute to send delegations to greet the monarch on the occasion of numerous dates, both personal and national.

== Objectives ==
The Institute was created with two central guidelines: the collection and publication of documents relevant to the history of Brazil and the encouragement, in public education, of studies of a historical nature.

The History of Brazil, to be written by the members of the IHGB, was to emphasize the values linked to national unity and political centralization, placing the young Brazilian nation as heir and continuer of the Portuguese civilizing task. The nation, whose past the IHGB was to build, was to emerge as the fruit of a white and European civilization in the tropics.

== Bibliography ==
- ARAÚJO, Valdei Lopes de. A Experiência do Tempo: conceitos e narrativas na formação nacional brasileira (1813-1845). São Paulo: Hucitec, 2008.
- DIAS, Fabiana Rodrigues. "Polifonia e consenso nas páginas da Revista do IHGB: a questão da mão de obra no processo de consolidação da nação", História da Historiografia, no. 5, 2010, 175–188.
- GONÇALVES, Sérgio Campos. "A figura do intelectual e a razão universal na fundação do Instituto Histórico e Geográfico Brasileiro". Brasiliana - Journal for Brazilian Studies, v. 2, p. 37-69, 2013.
- GUIMARÃES, Lúcia Maria Paschoal. Debaixo da imediata proteção de Sua Majestade Imperial: o Instituto Histórico e Geográfico Brasileiro (1838-1889). RIHGB, Rio de Janeiro, v. 156, nº 388, p. 459-613, jul/set 1995.

== See also ==
- Site official IHGB (in Portuguese)
- Historic and Geographic Institute of Alagoas
- Historic and Geographic Institute of Rio Grande do Sul
- Historic and Geographic Institute of Pará
