= Tavares Bastos (favela) =

Favela in Rio de Janeiro, Brazil

Coordinates: 22.9270°S 43.1818°W

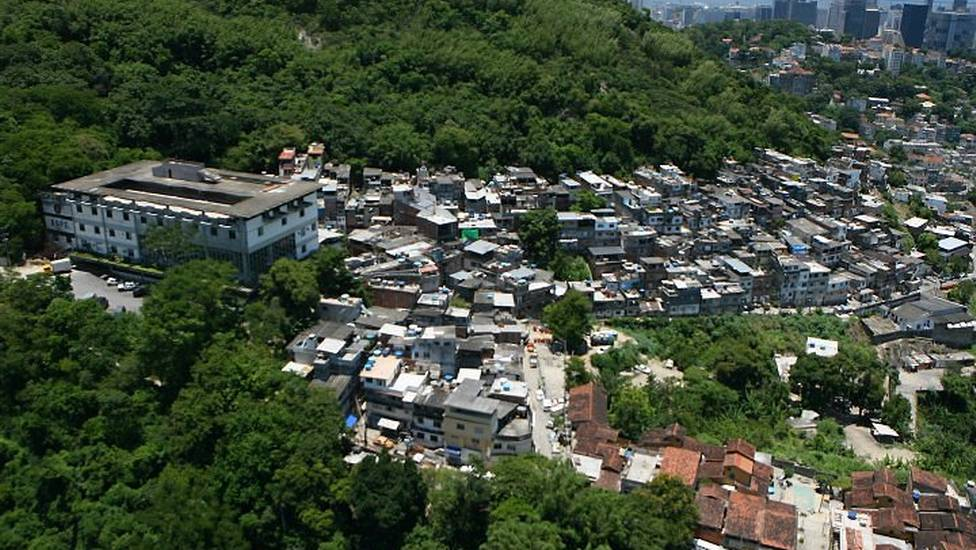
Tavares Bastos in 2015

Tavares Bastos is a favela in the Catete neighborhood of Rio de Janeiro, Brazil. It is named after the Brazilian politician Aureliano Cândido Tavares Bastos. The main access road is the Rua Tavares Bastos.

Many films have been filmed in the Tavares Bastos, including Elite Squad, Last Stop 174 and The Incredible Hulk. The Snoop Dogg and Pharrell Williams music video "Beautiful" was also filmed in the favela.

The favela used to be the only major city slum where drug trafficking or activities of militias were curtailed due to the presence of the headquarters of the Batalhão de Operações Policiais Especiais, the special police unit of the Military Police of Rio de Janeiro State. This was described in the factual book Elite da Tropa, which was made into the film Elite Squad.
