= Maceió =

Capital city of Alagoas, Brazil

- Municipality
- Municipality of Maceió
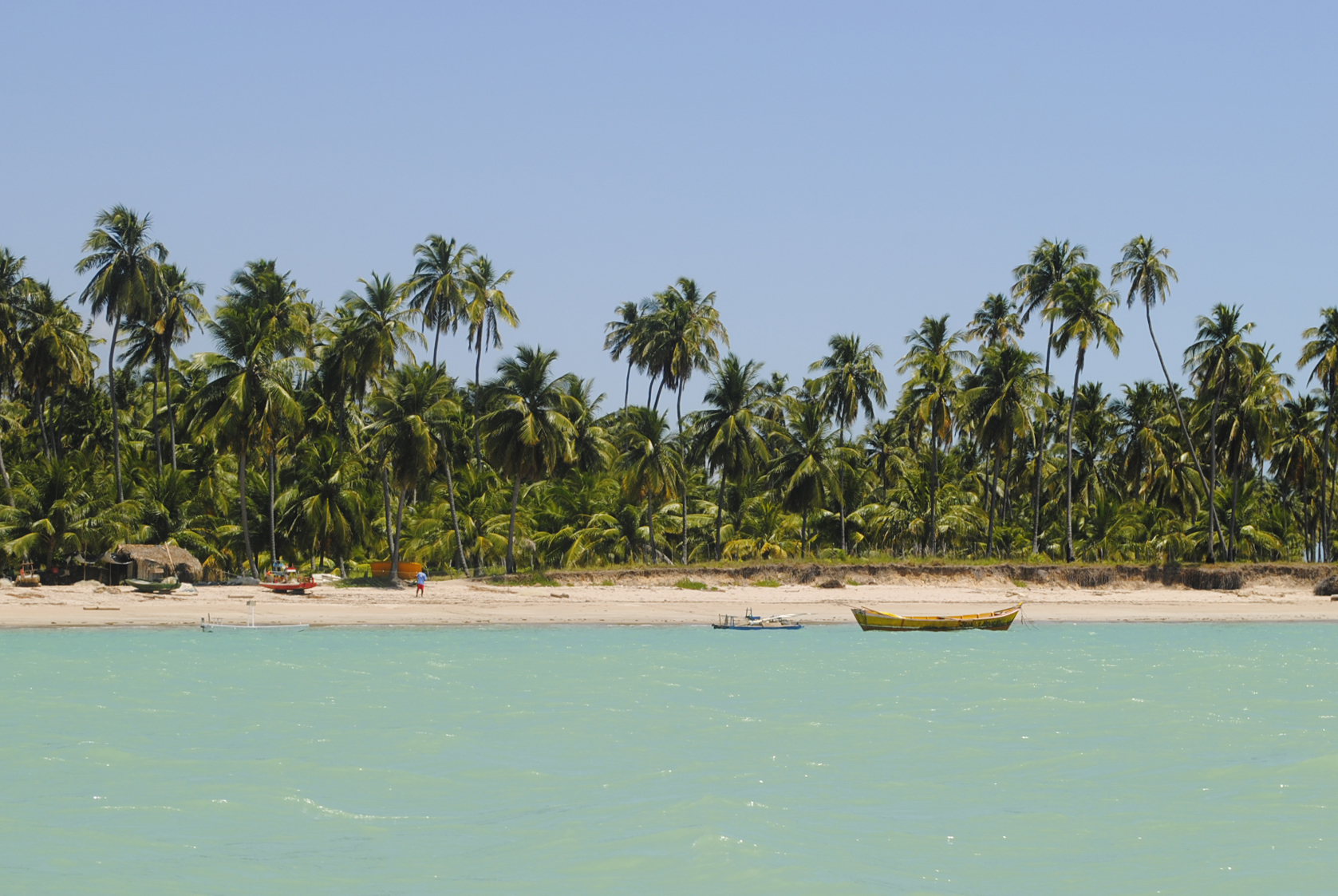
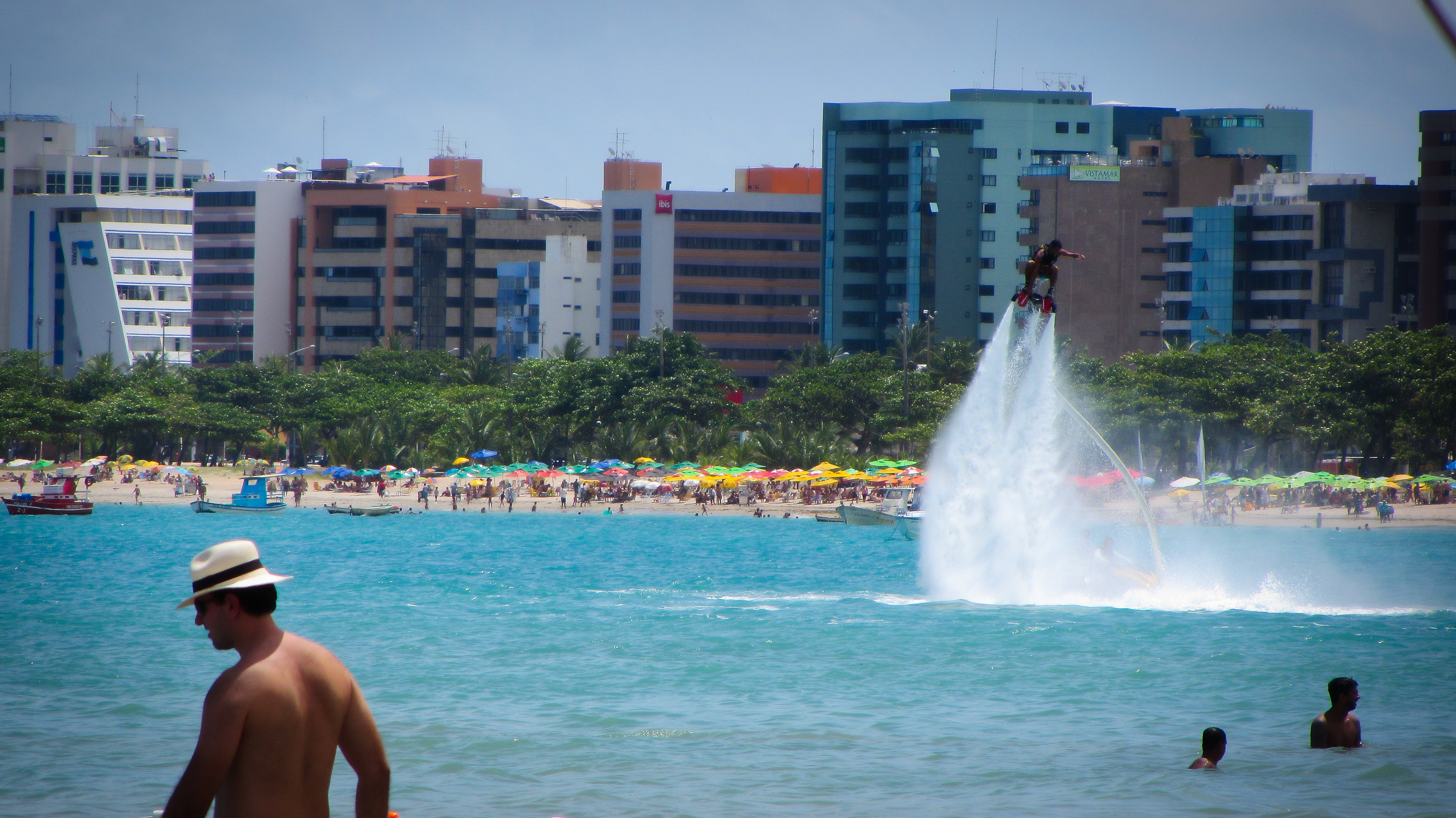
- Ipioca beach (left) and Pajuçara beach

- Flag Coat of arms
- Nickname: "Brazilian Caribbean"
- Location of Maceió in the State of Alagoas

- Location in Brazil
- Coordinates: 9°39′57″S 35°44′06″W
- Country: Brazil
- State: Alagoas
- Mesoregion: Leste Alagoano
- Microregion: Maceió, Alagoas, Brasil
- Founded: December 5, 1815

Government
  - Mayor: Rodrigo Cunha (PODE)

Area
  - Total: 511 km^{2} (197 sq mi)
- Elevation: 7 m (23 ft)

Population (2025)
  - Total: 994,952 (14th)
  - Density: 1,880.77/km^{2} (4,871.2/sq mi)
- Demonym: Maceioense
- Time zone: UTC−3 (BRT)
- Postal code: 57000-001 a 57099-999
- Area code: +55 82
- HDI (2010): 0.721 – high
- Website: www.maceio.al.gov.br

Maceió (Portuguese: [masejˈjɔ]), formerly anglicised as Maceio, is the capital and the largest city of the coastal state of Alagoas, Brazil. The name "Maceió" is a Tupi Indigenous term for a spring.

Most maceiós flow to the sea, but some get trapped and form lakes ("lagoas", in Portuguese). There are numerous maceiós and lakes in this part of Brazil; because of this, the city was named Maceió, and the state, Alagoas. The new Zumbi dos Palmares International Airport connects Maceió with many Brazilian cities and also operates some international flights. The city is home to the Federal University of Alagoas.

== Etymology ==
The name "Maceió" has origin in the Tupi term maçayó or maçaio-k, that means "that which covers the swamp". The Aurélio Dictionary says that the term "maceió" means a temporary and cyclic lagoon that is located at the edge of the sea at the mouth of a watercourse small enough to be interrupted by a sand bar until the high tide opens the way temporarily - cyclically relates to the season, river flow, lunar phase, etc.

Nineteenth-century shipping reports, which reported on ships bringing cotton from Maceió, spelt it as Macaio.

== History ==
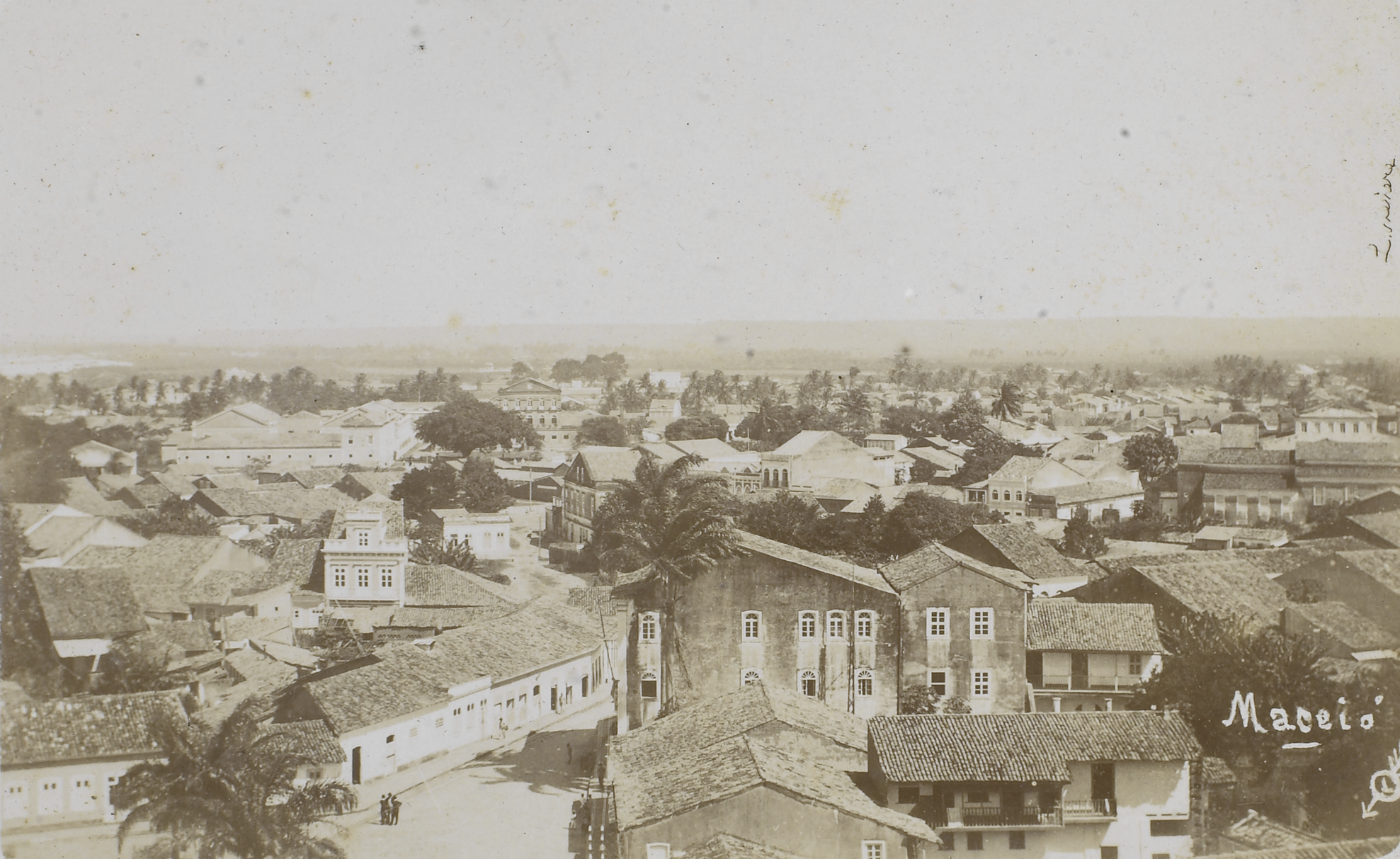
Maceió in 1905

The city began in an old sugar mill and plantation complex around the 19th century. Its development started with the arrival of ships taking wood from Jaraguá bay.

With the installation of the sugar mills, Maceió started to export sugar, then tobacco, coconut, leather, and some spices. Prosperity made it possible for the settlement to become a village on December 5, 1815. Thanks to its continued growth, Maceió became the capital of the Alagoas state on December 9, 1839.

Maceió is also a port city and due to its port development about 200 years ago it changed from a village into a city.

Maceió was reportedly hit hard by the 2015–16 Zika virus epidemic. 75% of all cases in Brazil were claimed to be registered in Alagoas. The cause for this concentration was never found. In reality, while the epidemic's epicenter is considered to be Bahia and Pernambuco, the incidence rate of Alagoas, nestled in between these two states (together with Sergipe), was considered a "paradox" by the Ministry of Health authorities given its low number of reported cases during the epidemic.

== Geography ==
The city is located between the Mundaú Lagoon and the Atlantic Ocean, with a tropical climate with average temperature of 25 °C (77 °F). As of 2021, its metropolitan area had a total population of 1,354,973 inhabitants.

=== Climate ===
Maceió has a typical tropical climate, specifically a tropical monsoon climate (Köppen climate classification: Am, somewhat bordering on As), with very warm to hot temperatures and high relative humidity all throughout the year. However, these conditions are relieved by a near absence of extreme temperatures due to trade winds blowing from the ocean.

January is the warmest month, with mean maximum of 32 °C (89.6 °F) and minimum of 22 °C (71.6 °F) and more sun; July experiences the coolest temperatures, with mean maximum of 27 °C (80.6 °F) and minimum of 17 °C (62.6 °F) accompanied by higher humidity and much more rain.

The natural vegetation surrounding Maceió is tropical rainforest. Rainforests are characterized by high rainfall, with definitions setting minimum normal annual rainfall between 2,000 and 1,700 millimetres (79 and 67 in; 2 and 2 m). The soil can be poor because high rainfall tends to leach out soluble nutrients.

Climate data for Maceió (1981–2010, extremes 1961–present)
Month	Jan	Feb	Mar	Apr	May	Jun	Jul	Aug	Sep	Oct	Nov	Dec	Year
Record high °C (°F)	34.8 (94.6)	34.9 (94.8)	35.0 (95.0)	35.3 (95.5)	36.4 (97.5)	31.8 (89.2)	31.1 (88.0)	31.8 (89.2)	39.3 (102.7)	34.6 (94.3)	38.4 (101.1)	35.4 (95.7)	39.3 (102.7)
Mean daily maximum °C (°F)	31.0 (87.8)	31.4 (88.5)	31.5 (88.7)	30.6 (87.1)	29.5 (85.1)	28.3 (82.9)	27.6 (81.7)	27.6 (81.7)	28.4 (83.1)	29.9 (85.8)	30.8 (87.4)	31.2 (88.2)	29.8 (85.6)
Daily mean °C (°F)	26.0 (78.8)	26.2 (79.2)	26.5 (79.7)	26.0 (78.8)	25.1 (77.2)	24.1 (75.4)	23.5 (74.3)	23.5 (74.3)	24.1 (75.4)	25.1 (77.2)	25.6 (78.1)	26.0 (78.8)	25.1 (77.2)
Mean daily minimum °C (°F)	21.4 (70.5)	21.8 (71.2)	22.1 (71.8)	21.8 (71.2)	21.2 (70.2)	20.3 (68.5)	19.7 (67.5)	19.7 (67.5)	19.9 (67.8)	20.3 (68.5)	20.9 (69.6)	21.2 (70.2)	20.9 (69.6)
Record low °C (°F)	17.9 (64.2)	17.8 (64.0)	16.4 (61.5)	13.2 (55.8)	17.0 (62.6)	11.3 (52.3)	15.0 (59.0)	15.0 (59.0)	15.8 (60.4)	17.0 (62.6)	17.4 (63.3)	17.9 (64.2)	11.3 (52.3)
Average rainfall mm (inches)	83.0 (3.27)	72.9 (2.87)	117.4 (4.62)	207.5 (8.17)	296.9 (11.69)	353.8 (13.93)	265.2 (10.44)	201.5 (7.93)	120.2 (4.73)	61.6 (2.43)	46.9 (1.85)	40.5 (1.59)	1,867.4 (73.52)
Average rainy days (≥ 1.0 mm)	9	7	10	16	18	22	23	20	13	7	5	6	156
Average relative humidity (%)	75.9	74.2	74.9	77.8	81.1	82.6	82.8	81.9	78.7	76.1	74.1	73.9	77.8
Mean monthly sunshine hours	241.4	218.6	209.6	202.5	198.5	162.8	169.2	180.6	190.2	220.4	247.9	257.5	2,499.2
Source 1: Instituto Nacional de Meteorologia
Source 2: Meteo Climat (record highs and lows)

Climate data for Maceió (1991-2020)
Month	Jan	Feb	Mar	Apr	May	Jun	Jul	Aug	Sep	Oct	Nov	Dec	Year
Mean daily maximum °C (°F)	31.0 (87.8)	31.3 (88.3)	31.5 (88.7)	30.7 (87.3)	29.5 (85.1)	28.4 (83.1)	27.6 (81.7)	27.8 (82.0)	28.6 (83.5)	29.9 (85.8)	30.8 (87.4)	31.3 (88.3)	29.9 (85.8)
Average precipitation mm (inches)	91.2 (3.59)	80.2 (3.16)	101.3 (3.99)	194.3 (7.65)	294.7 (11.60)	322.8 (12.71)	270.9 (10.67)	191.5 (7.54)	109.2 (4.30)	70.2 (2.76)	45.1 (1.78)	36.7 (1.44)	1,808.1 (71.19)
Average rainy days	10	11	17	19	22	24	23	19	15	10	6	9	185
Average relative humidity (%)	77.1	76.0	—	78.3	81.3	83.3	84.1	82.7	80.4	77.4	75.6	75.1	—
Average dew point °C (°F)	22.2 (72.0)	22.3 (72.1)	22.6 (72.7)	22.6 (72.7)	22.4 (72.3)	22.0 (71.6)	21.5 (70.7)	21.3 (70.3)	21.4 (70.5)	21.6 (70.9)	21.7 (71.1)	22.0 (71.6)	22.0 (71.5)
Mean daily sunshine hours	8.2	8.1	6.5	6.6	6.2	6	5.7	6.6	6.8	8.1	9.2	8.5	7.2
Mean daily daylight hours	12.6	12.4	12.1	11.9	11.7	11.6	11.6	11.8	12.1	12.3	12.6	12.7	12.1
Average ultraviolet index	12	12	12	12	10	9	9	10	12	12	12	12	11
Source 1: INMET(Precipitation), (Dew Point), (Humidity)
Source 2: Weather atlas(Sun-daylight-UV-Rainy days)

== Economy ==
One substantial local industry is based on chemical products from brine pumped from deep wells on the outskirts of Maceió. Another substantial industry is the production of ethanol and sugar from sugarcane grown in the region. In the last thirty years the tourist industry has transformed the coastal areas of the city into vibrant centers of entertainment for Brazilian and foreign tourists (Americans, Italians, French, Germans, Argentinians, etc.).

These coastal neighborhoods include coconut palm trees, playgrounds, squares, open-to-the-public football, volleyball, and basketball fields, residential buildings, bars, nightclubs, tourist-oriented shops, restaurants, banks, hotels, and gambling houses (slot machines and bingo only, since casino games are illegal in Brazil).

The GDP for the city was R$23,400,000,000 (as of 2019); The per capita income for the city was R$22,976.51 (as of 2019).

== Gallery ==
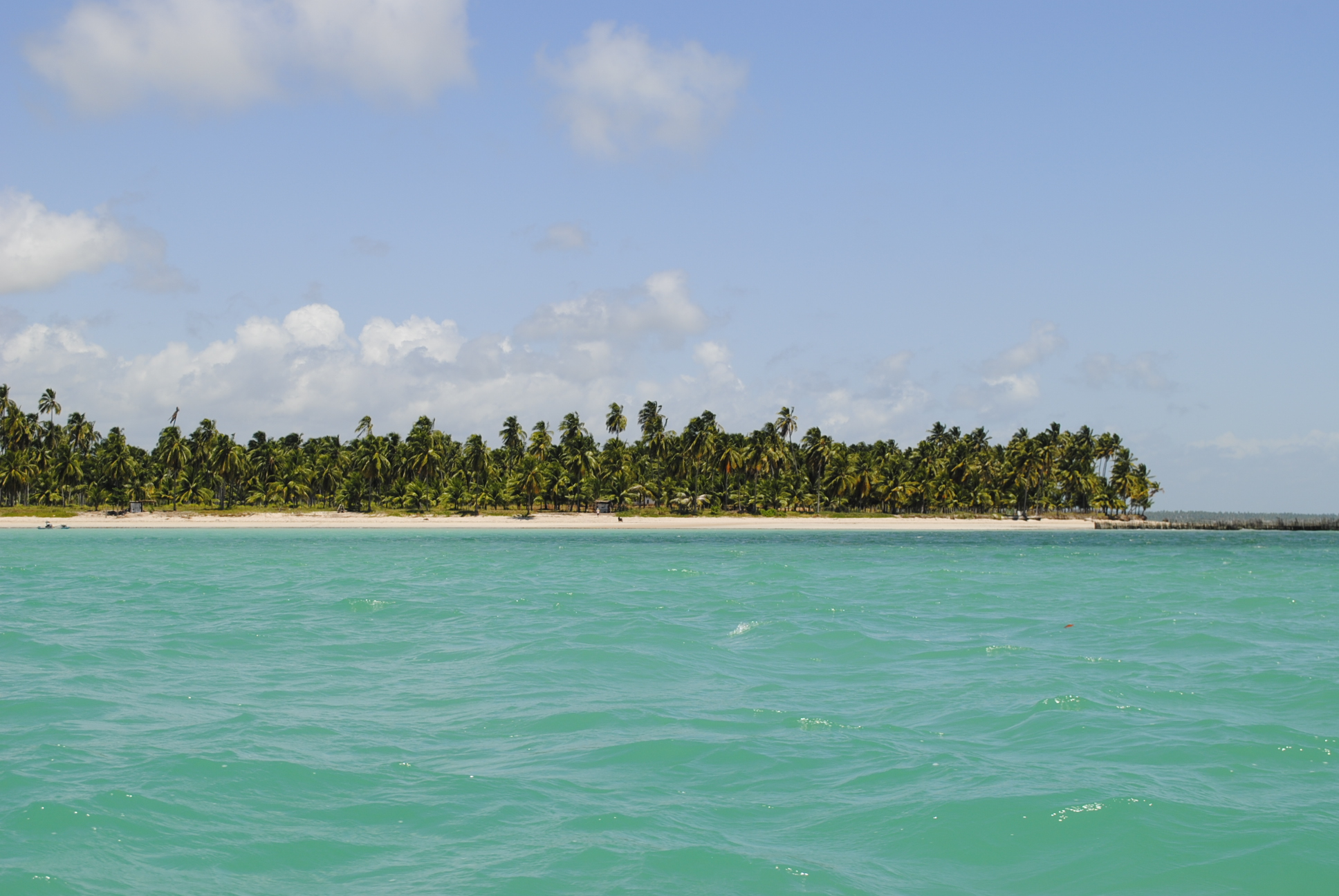
Ipioca beach in Maceió

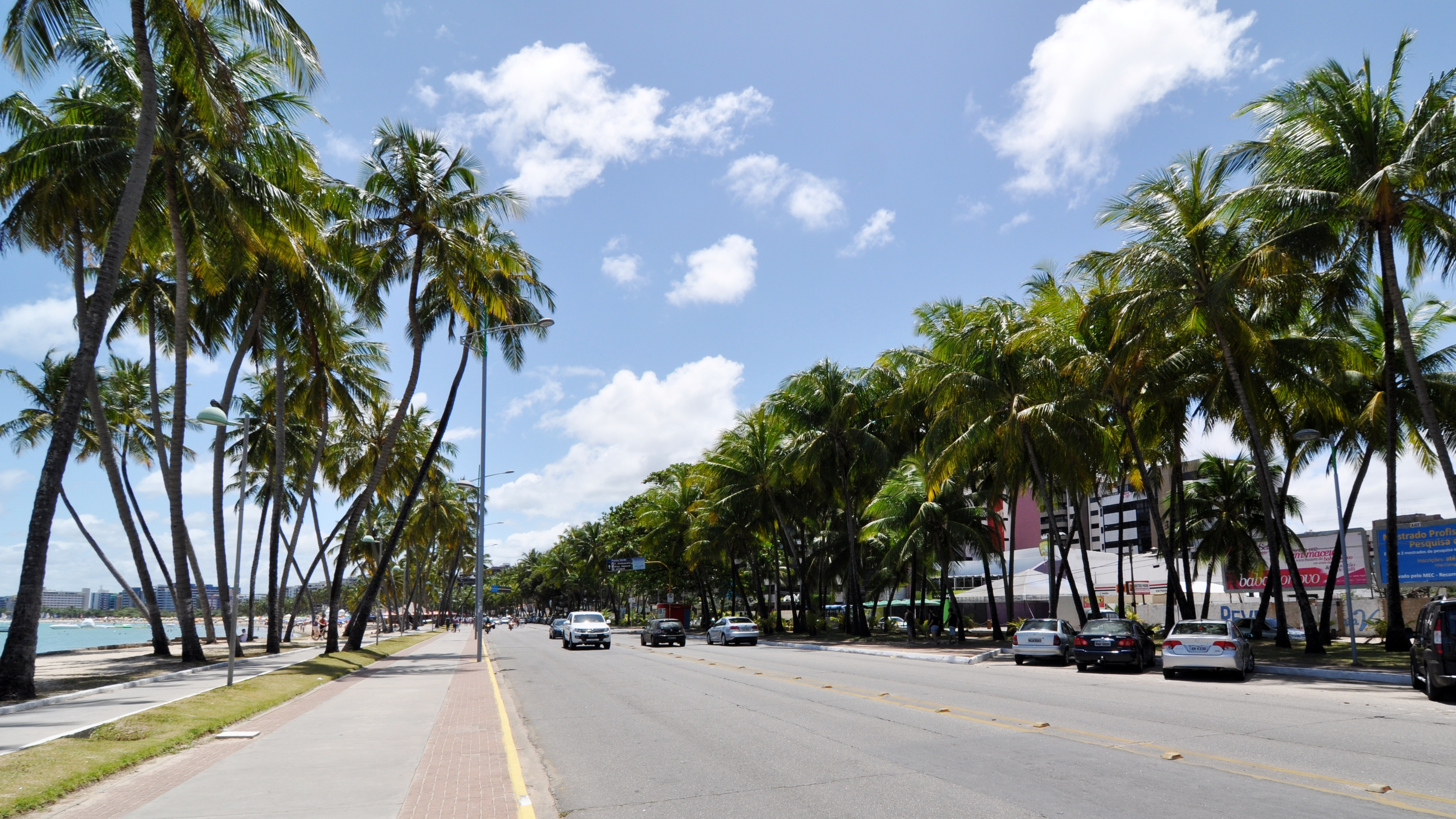
Entrecoqueiros Avenue

== Transportation ==
=== Public Transportation ===
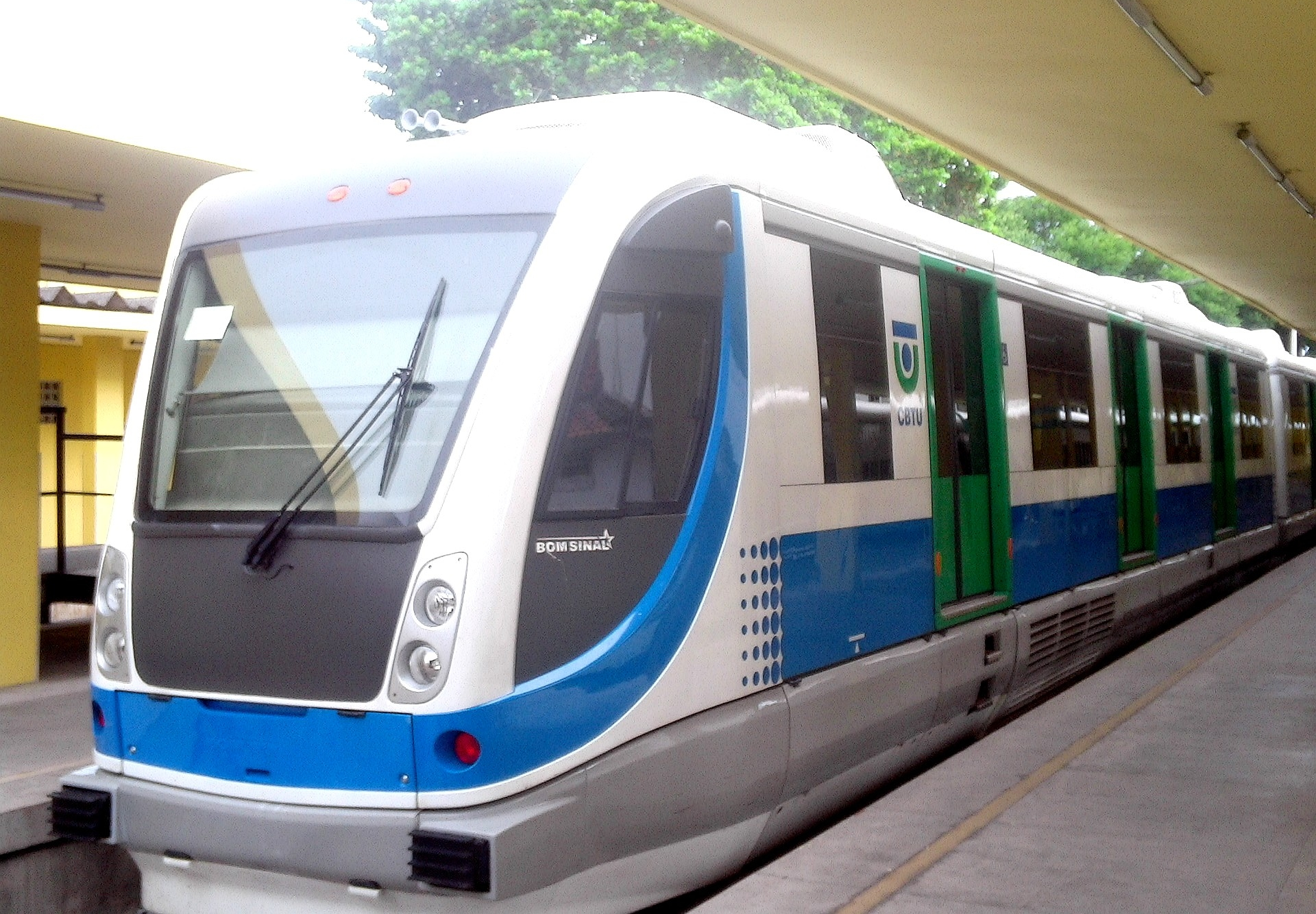
Maceió Light Train

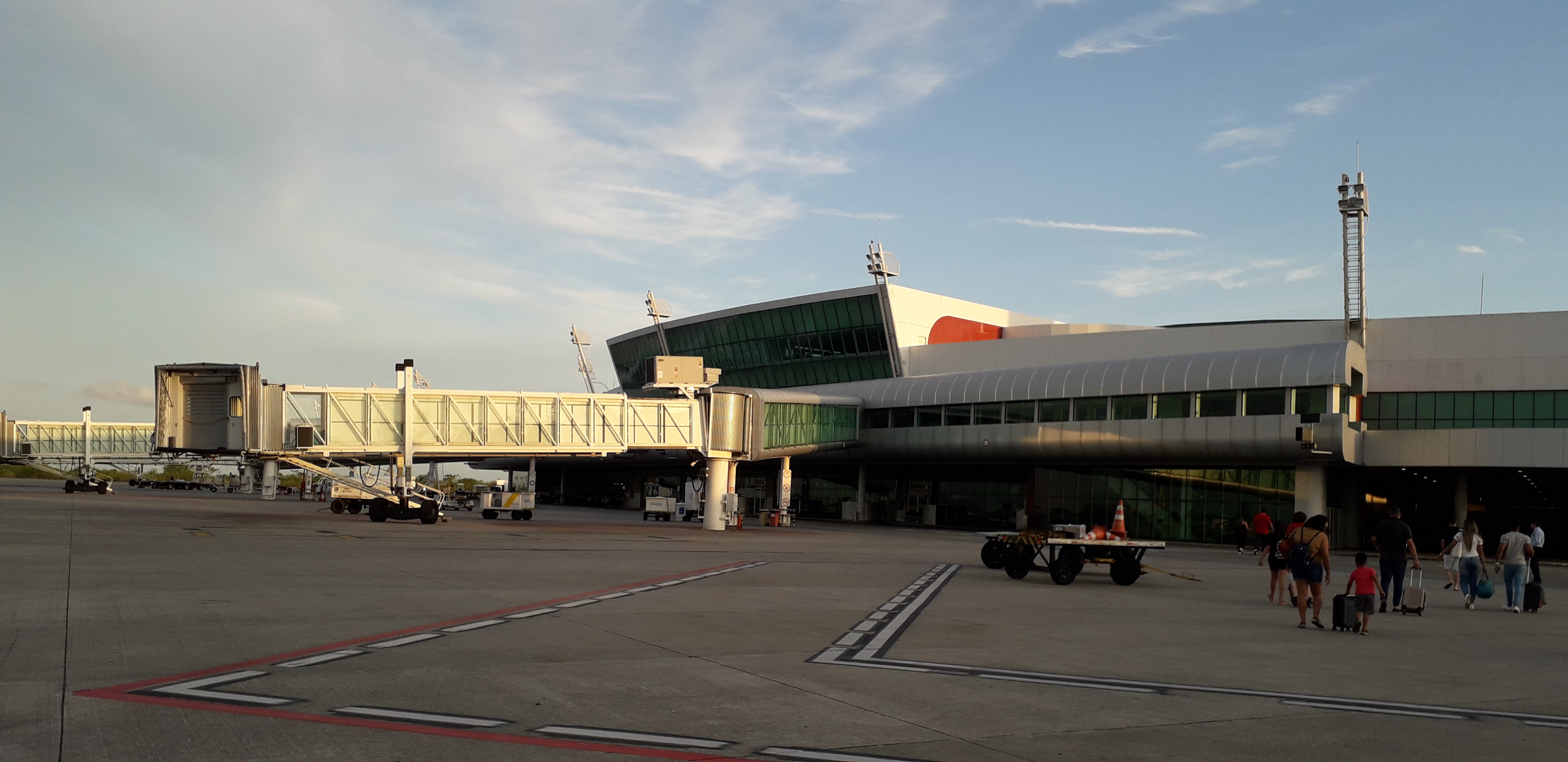
Zumbi dos Palmares International Airport.

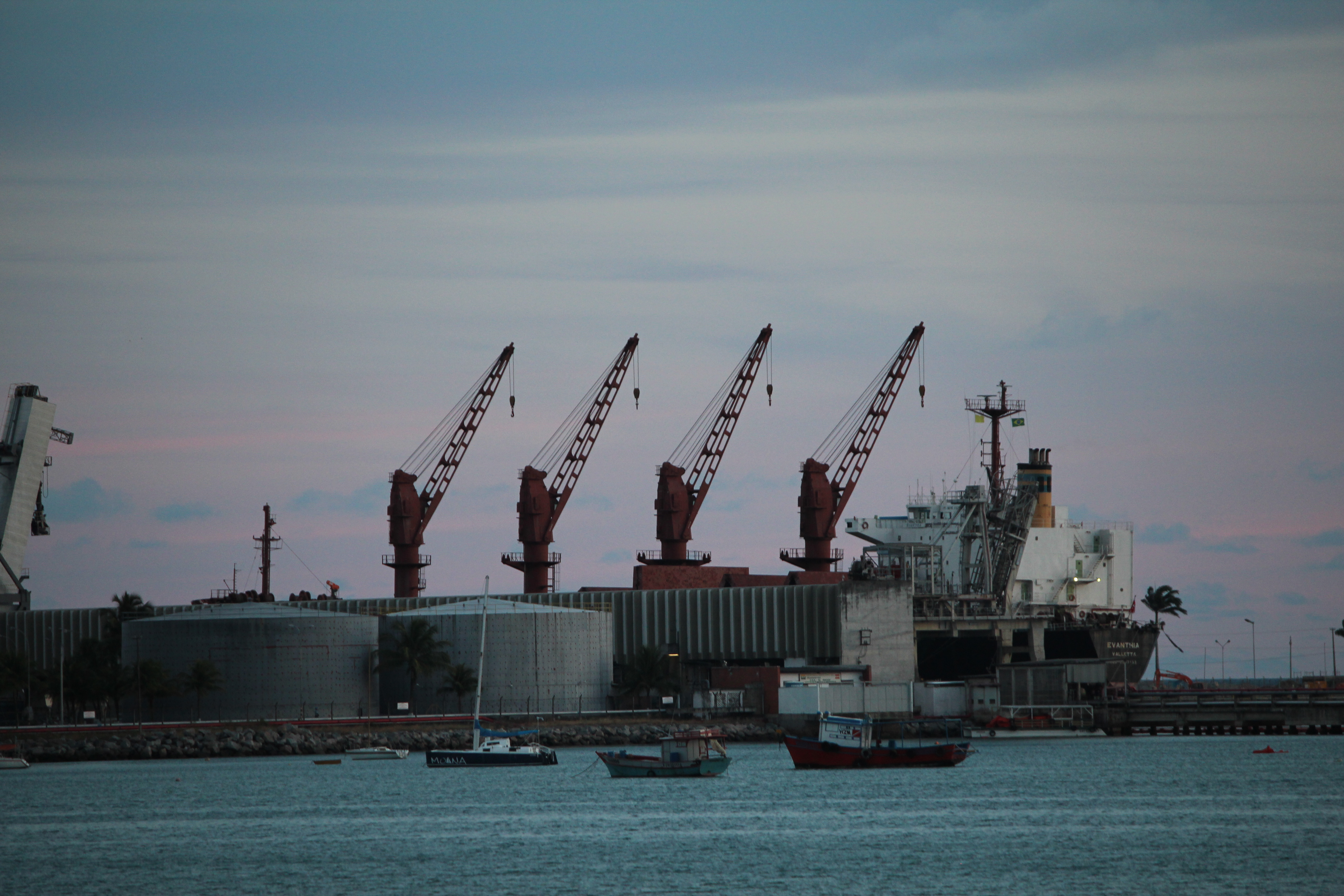
Port of Maceió.

Maceió is served by Maceió Urban Rail, a light rail system.

=== International Airport ===
Zumbi dos Palmares International Airport located outside Maceió serves the area with international connections to Lisbon in Portugal and Buenos Aires in Argentina, as well as cities throughout Brazil.

In 2021 the airport handled 1,893,812 passengers.

=== Port ===
The Port of Jaraguá is a Brazilian port located in Maceió. The commercial and economic development of the Port of Jaraguá, next to the margins of the Mundaú lagoon, was responsible for the emergence of an important settlement that received the name of Maceió and later became the present capital of Alagoas. The Port of Jaraguá is situated in a natural port area that facilitates the ships docking. During the Brazilian colonial period, the most important products exported from there port were sugar, tobacco, coconut and spices. The Biggest Cruise Ship to attract at port was MSC Seashore in 2022.

=== Highways ===
Maceió is connected to the main cities of Brazil by the BR-104, BR-101, BR-316 and AL-101 highways. The distances to other Brazilian cities are shown below:

- Brasília: 2010 km (1249 mi);
- Recife: 270 km (168 mi);
- Aracaju: 290 km (180 mi);
- Salvador: 610 km (379 mi).

== Twin towns – sister cities ==
- Aracaju, Brazil
- João Pessoa, Brazil
- Gwangju, South Korea
- Milan, Italy

== Neighbourhoods ==
There are today about 50 districts in Maceió:

- Antares
- Barro Duro
- Bebedouro
- Benedito Bentes
- Bom Parto
- Canaã
- Centro de Maceió (Downtown)
- Chã de Bebedouro
- Chã da Jaqueira
- Cidade Universitária
- Clima Bom
- Cruz das Almas
- Farol
- Feitosa
- Fernão Velho
- Garça Torta
- Gruta de Lourdes
- Guaxuma
- Ipioca
- Jacarecica
- Jacintinho
- Jaraguá
- Jardim Petrópolis
- Jatiúca
- Levada
- Mangabeiras
- Mutange
- Ouro Preto
- Pajuçara
- Pescaria
- Pinheiro
- Pitanguinha
- Poço
- Ponta da Terra
- Ponta Grossa
- Ponta Verde
- Pontal da Barra
- Prado
- Petrópolis
- Riacho Doce
- Rio Novo
- Santa Amélia
- Santo Amaro
- Santos Dumont
- São Jorge
- Serraria
- Tabuleiro do Martins
- Trapiche da Barra
- Vergel do Lago.

== Surrounding highlights ==
- Praia do Francês (French's Beach)
- Barra Nova (New Waterway)
- Dunas de Marapé (Dunes of Marapé)
- Nove Ilhas (Nine Islands)
- Massagüera (or Massagueira)
- Barra de São Miguel (San Miguel Waterway)
- Praia do Gunga (Gunga's Beach)
- Sonho Verde (Green Dream)
- Barra de Santo Antônio (Santo Antonio Waterway)
- Maragogi
- Murici
- Japaratinga
- Pontal do Coruripe
- Statue of Liberty replica in front of Museu da Imagem e do Som de Alagoas (Museum of Image and Sound of Alagoas)

== See also ==
- Historic and Geographic Institute of Alagoas
- History of Alagoas
