= Marechal Deodoro, Alagoas =

Municipality of Alagoas, Brazil

Coordinates: 09°42′36″S 35°53′42″W

Marechal Deodoro

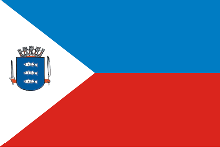
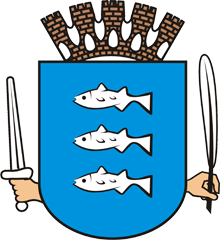
- Flag Coat of arms

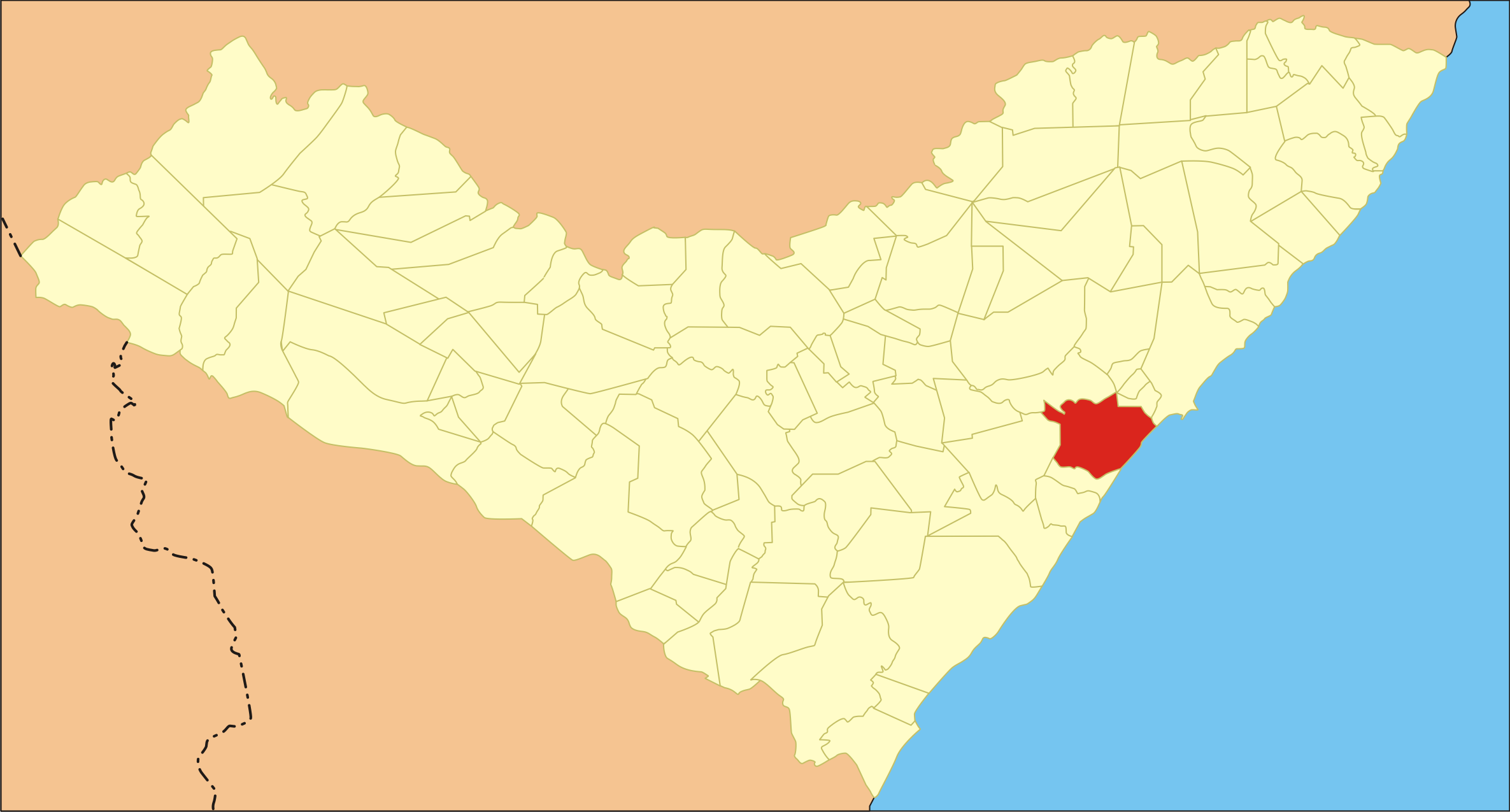
- Established: 5 August 1611

Area
  - Total: 333.548 km^{2} (128.784 sq mi)

Population
  - Total: 52,380
  - Density: 157.0/km^{2} (406.7/sq mi)

Marechal Deodoro (Central northeastern portuguese pronunciation: [maɾɛˈʃɐw dɛɔˈdɔɾʊ]) is a municipality and an important tourist center of Alagoas, Brazil. Its population is 52,380 (2020) and its area is 334 km^{2} (129 sq mi). The town was the first capital of Alagoas state.

== History ==
The city was founded as Vila Madalena in 1611, and features a number of historical buildings from the colonial period. It was also referred to as Alagoas, or the City of Alagoas. The first president of the Republic of Brazil, Marshal (Portuguese: Marechal) Deodoro da Fonseca, was born in Vila Madalena; the city was later renamed in his honour.

== Notable people ==
- Manuel Deodoro da Fonseca, Brazilian military officer, politician and first president of Brazil
- Aureliano Cândido Tavares Bastos, Brazilian politician, writer and journalist

== See also ==
- List of National Historic Heritage of Brazil — three sites in Marechal Deodoro are listed
- List of municipalities in Alagoas
