= Aureliano Cândido Tavares Bastos =

Brazilian politician and writer

- Portrait of Aureliano Cândido Tavares.
- Born: 20 April 1839; Marechal Deodoro, Alagoas, Brazil
- Died: 3 December 1875 (aged 36); Nice, France
- Occupations: Politician, writer, journalist
- Parents: José Tavares Bastos (father); Rosa Candida Araujo (mother)

Aureliano Cândido Tavares Bastos (20 April 1839 – 3 December 1875) was a Brazilian politician, writer and journalist. He was a supporter of federalism within the Empire of Brazil. The family surname is Tavares Bastos.

== Early life ==
Tavares Bastos was the first of six children born to Brazilian politician José Tavares Bastos and Rosa Candida Araujo. He attended the University of São Paulo Law School and graduated in 1858 at age 20. He followed this by earning a doctorate in law in 1859.

== Political career ==
In 1860, Tavares Bastos was elected to the legislature for the province of Alagoas. In 1861, after openly disagreeing with the Minister of the Navy, Tavares Bastos was dismissed from his official position as Secretary of the Navy. In 1864, Tavares Bastos was re-elected deputy and attended the Mission Hail by the River Plate as secretary.

== Death and legacy ==
In 1874 Tavares Bastos travelled to Europe due to his poor health. He died from pneumonia on 3 December 1875. His body was buried in the city of Rio de Janeiro, where he lived much of his life, on 2 May 1876. Rio's Tavares Bastos favela is named after him.

== Views ==
Tavares Bastos was a supporter of liberalism. His ideas were influenced by American missionary James Cooley Fletcher, and thinkers such as John Stuart Mill, Alexis de Tocqueville and Alexander Hamilton. As such advocated the separation of church and state and even the immigration of Protestants in the region.

== Published works ==
In 1862 he anonymously published Cartas do Solitário (English: The Lone Letters) in Correio Mercantil. The book consists of letters that deal with issues such as administrative centralization, the opening of the Amazon River to navigation, freedom of navigation cabotage and communications with the United States. In 1870, he published A província (English: The Province), which opposed the centralization of government. In 1872, he published A situação e o Partido Liberal (English: The Situation and the Liberal Party), and in 1873 studies on Electoral Reform.

Year	Book title
1861	Os males do presente e as esperanças do futuro
1862	Cartas do Solitário
1866	O vale do Amazonas. (A livre navegação do Amazonas, estatistica, producções, commercio, questões fiscaes do valle do Amazonas)
1867	Memória sobre an imigração (Reflexões sobre an imigração)
1870	A província. Estudo sobre a descentralização no Brasil
1872	A situação e o Partido Liberal
1873	A reforma eleitoral e parlamentar e Constituição da magistratura

== Recognition ==
Tavares Bastos was one of the original patrons of the Academia Brasileira de Letras, holding the 35th seat.
