= Aqualtune =

Kongo princess (fl. 1665-75)

Aqualtune Ezgondidu Mahamud da Silva Santos
- Born: Kingdom of Kongo
- Died: 1675
- Issue: Ganga Zumba; Gana Zona; Sabina
- House: Kongo

Aqualtune (fl. 1665-75) was a Kongo princess who was the daughter of an unidentified Manikongo. According to the tradition, she was the mother of Ganga Zumba and the maternal grandmother of Zumbi.

In 1665, Aqualtune led a force of ten thousand Kongo men and women in the Battle of Mbwila, where King Antonio I was killed and she was captured in defeat. She was then transported to the Port of Recife, a warehouse and sugar mill. She was purchased as a breeding slave, and was later sold to a mill in Porto Calvo, already pregnant. She then escaped her enslavement, reaching the Palmares quilombo. She then became the leader of the Subupuira quilombo, which was northeast of the capital of the Palmares. She had two sons, Ganga Zumba and Gana Zona, who both took on leadership roles in the Palmares. Zumbi was the child of her daughter Sabina. Her fate and later life is unknown, dying a mysterious death in 1675.

== Legacy ==
A biography about her was written by author Jarid Arraes as part of her 2015 cordel collection and book Heroínas Negras Brasileiras em 15 cordéis.
