= Quilombo (film) =

1984 film directed by Carlos Diegues

- Theatrical release poster
- Directed by: Carlos Diegues
- Written by: Carlos Diegues; João Felicio dos Santos; Décio Freitas
- Produced by: Augusto Arraes
- Starring: Antônio Pompêo; Zezé Motta; Tony Tornado; Vera Fischer
- Cinematography: Lauro Escorel
- Edited by: Mair Tavares
- Music by: Gilberto Gil
- Production companies: CDK Produções; Embrafilme; Gaumont
- Distributed by: Embrafilme
- Release date: June 7, 1984
- Running time: 119 minutes
- Country: Brazil
- Language: Portuguese

Quilombo is a 1984 Brazilian drama film directed by Carlos Diegues. It was entered into the 1984 Cannes Film Festival. The film is based on the history of the Quilombo dos Palmares, a community of escaped slaves that numbered in the thousands during the 17th century in north-eastern Brazil.

== Cast ==
- Antônio Pompêo - Zumbi
- Zezé Motta - Dandara dos Palmares
- Tony Tornado - Ganga Zumba
- Vera Fischer - Ana de Ferro
- Antônio Pitanga - Acaiuba
- Maurício do Valle - Domingos Jorge Velho
- Daniel Filho - Carrilho
- João Nogueira - Rufino
- Jorge Coutinho - Sale
- Grande Otelo - Baba
- Joffre Soares - Caninde
- Camila Pitanga
- Jonas Bloch
- Chico Diaz
- Léa Garcia
- Milton Gonçalves
- Zózimo Bulbul
- Arduíno Colassanti
- Carlos Kroeber
- Thelma Reston

== See also ==
- Ganga Zumba (1963 Brazilian film on the same historical events)
- List of films featuring slavery
