= Cerca do Macaco =

Place in Brazil

Cerca do Macaco Cerca Real dos Macacos; Macaco
- Historical settlement
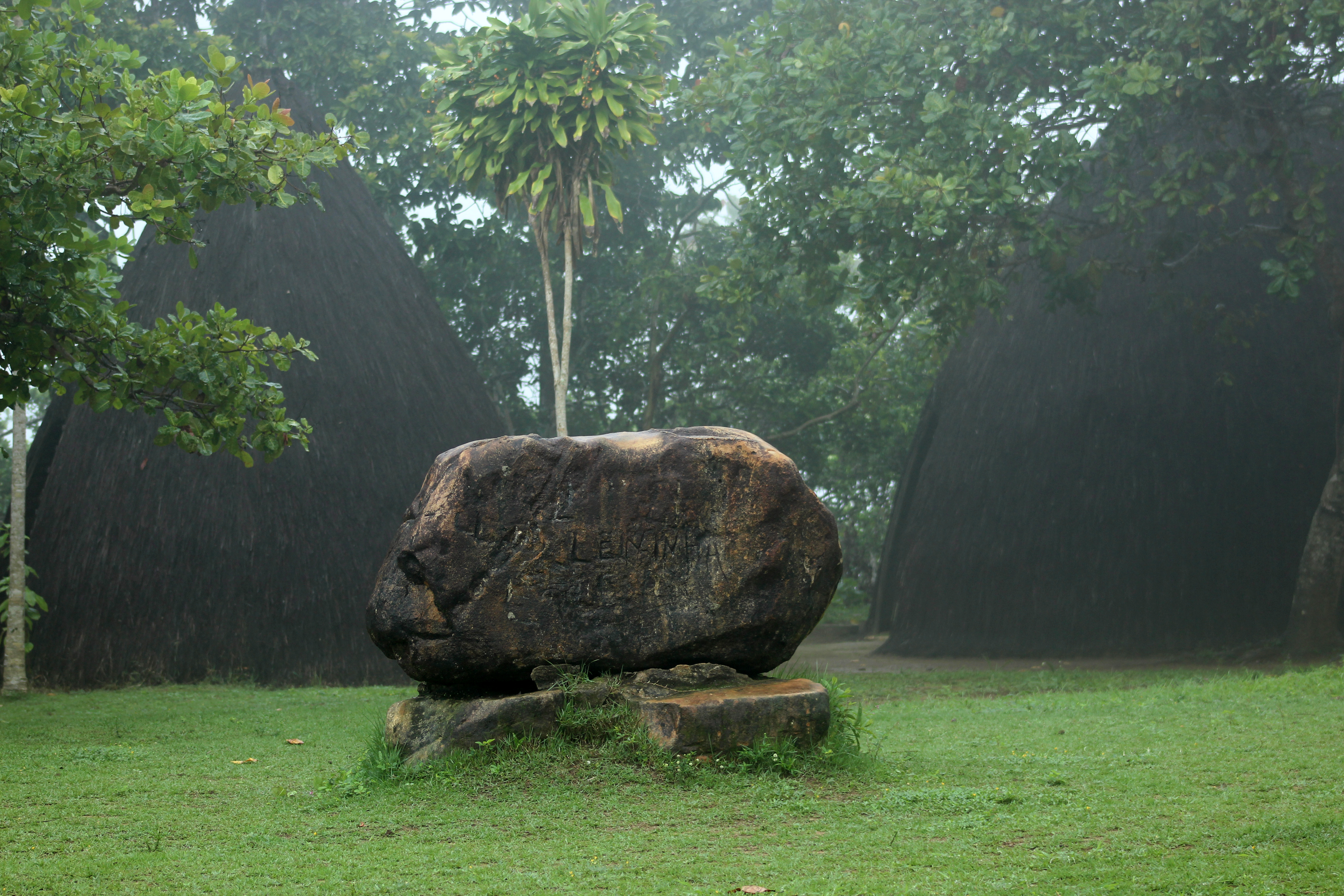
- Stone with writings at the Quilombo dos Palmares memorial, at the original site of Macaco
- Interactive map of Cerca do Macaco
- Coordinates: 9°10′12″S 36°5′17″W
- Country: Brazil
- State: Alagoas
- Founded: c. 1602

Government
  - Last ruler: Zumbi

Population
  - Total: Up to 10,000

Cerca do Macaco, also called "Cerca Real dos Macacos" or just "Macaco", was an historical settlement located on the peak of the Serra da Barriga in the state of Alagoas, Brazil. It was the main settlement of the Palmares, an established group of fugitives and escaped slaves.

== History ==
The settlement may have been founded as early as 1602, by which time Portuguese settlers were reporting that their captives were running away and building mocambos, or small communities in the surrounding area. At this time, most enslaved Africans in the area were from Portuguese Angola, and a report from 1671 suggests that the founders of Macaco were Angolan. Quilombos were settlements mainly of survivors and free-born enslaved African people. No contemporary document called Palmares a quilombo; instead the term mocambo was used. This suggests that Macaco in the 1600s was occupied by not only escaped enslaved Africans, but also by mulattos, caboclos, Indians and poor whites, especially Portuguese soldiers trying to escape forced military service.

Dutch descriptions by Caspar Barlaeus (published 1647) and Johan Nieuhof (published 1682) spoke of two larger consolidated entities in the area, "Great Palmares" and "Little Palmares". In each of these units there was a large central town that was fortified and held 5,000-6,000 people. A description of the visit of Johan Blaer to one of the larger mocambos in 1645 (which had been abandoned) revealed that there were 220 buildings in the community, a church, four smithies, and a council house. This is probably similar to the layout of Macaco at that time.

After 1654 the Portuguese began organizing expeditions against the mocambos of Palmares, including Macaco. During this time, Macaco was likely a town of up to 10,000 people. Macaco became the capital of the kingdom of "Angola Janga" which according to the Portuguese meant "Little Angola," although this is not a direct translation.

From 1680 to 1694, Zumbi ruled from Macaco as the king of Angola Janga. During this time, there was near constant war against the Portuguese. This concluded with a final assault against Macaco in January 1694, led by Domingos Jorge Velho. Though Zumbi eluded capture, he was later captured and executed on 20 November 1695.

After the war, Velho and his followers were given land grants in the former territory of Angola Janga, which they occupied as a means of keeping the kingdom from being reconstituted. The land surrounding Macaco has since mainly been used to cultivate sugar cane and for cattle-farming.

The town of União dos Palmares is located 7km to the east of the site of Macaco. In 1944 it was renamed from its previous name (União) to reflect its historical significance.

In 1986 the site of the city was listed in the National Institute of Historic and Artistic Heritage (IPHAN), and in 2003 it was officially opened by the President of Brazil. The site is now protected by Parque Nacional Serra da Barriga and Parque Memorial Quilombo dos Palmares.

== See also ==
- List of topics related to Black and African people
- Atlantic slave trade
- Creole
- Zumbi
- Brazilians
- History of Portugal
