= Black consciousness =

Black consciousness may refer to:

- Black Consciousness Movement, an anti-apartheid movement in the 1960s in South Africa
- The concept of forming a conscious Black identity promoted in the black power movement
- Black Consciousness Day, or Black Awareness Day, a day celebrated every November 20 in Brazil
