= Dandara dos Palmares =

17th-century Brazilian freed slave and warrior

- Born: February 6, 1654
- Died: 1694 (aged 39–40)
- Other name: Dandara

Dandara (Portuguese: Dandara dos Palmares) (1654 – February 6, 1694 CE) was an Afro-Brazilian warrior of the colonial period of Brazil and was part of the Quilombo dos Palmares, a settlement of Afro-Brazilian people who freed themselves from enslavement, in the present-day state of Alagoas. After being arrested on February 6, 1694, she committed suicide, refusing to return to a life of slavery. Not much is known about her life. Most of the stories about her are varied and disconnected. She and her husband Zumbi dos Palmares, the last king of the Quilombo dos Palmares, had three children.

== Personality and abilities ==
Described as a hero, Dandara dominated the techniques of capoeira and fought many battles alongside men and women to defend Palmares, the place where escaped slaves would go to live safely. Palmares was established in the 17th century in the Serra da Barriga, in the state of Alagoas, because it was difficult to access the area due to its dense vegetation.

It is unknown if she was born in Brazil or in Africa. When she was a young girl, she joined a group of Afro-Brazilians to fight against slavery in Brazil. She helped create strategies to protect Palmares. Dandara was known as a fighter, but she also had interests in hunting and agriculture. She planted corn, cassava, beans, sweet potatoes, sugarcane, and bananas.

The people of Palmares, known as Palmarinos, produced tools for agriculture and weapons for war. They also worked with wood, ceramics, and metals. Initially, all of the activities and work of the Palmarinos was to create their self-sustaining community, but some traded with villages and mills in the region.

Attacks to Palmares became frequent starting in 1630, with the Dutch invasion in Brazil. According to the stories regarding Dandara, she had an important role in making her husband cut ties with his uncle Ganga-Zumba, who was the first big chief of Quilombo dos Palmares. In 1678, Ganga-Zumba signed a peace treaty with the government of the state of Pernambuco. The treaty stated that people of Palmares who had been arrested were to be released. Also, all those born in Palmares were to be free people, not slaves, and they were granted permission to engage in commerce. However, in exchange, the people of Palmares had to stop giving refuge to any new runaway slaves and hand over to the Portuguese authorities any such runaways seeking shelter. Dandara and Zumbi dos Palmares are said to have opposed the deal because it did not end slavery, and in fact made Palmares complicit in its perpetuation. Ganga-Zumba was killed by one of the Palmarinos who opposed his proposal.

== Tributes ==
- The indie game Dandara, developed by Long Hat House and published by Raw Fury, is inspired by Dandara.
- A biography about her was written by author Jarid Arraes as part of her 2015 cordel collection and book Heroínas Negras Brasileiras em 15 cordéis.
