= Quilombo =

Type of Brazilian settlement inhabited by escaped slaves and their descendants

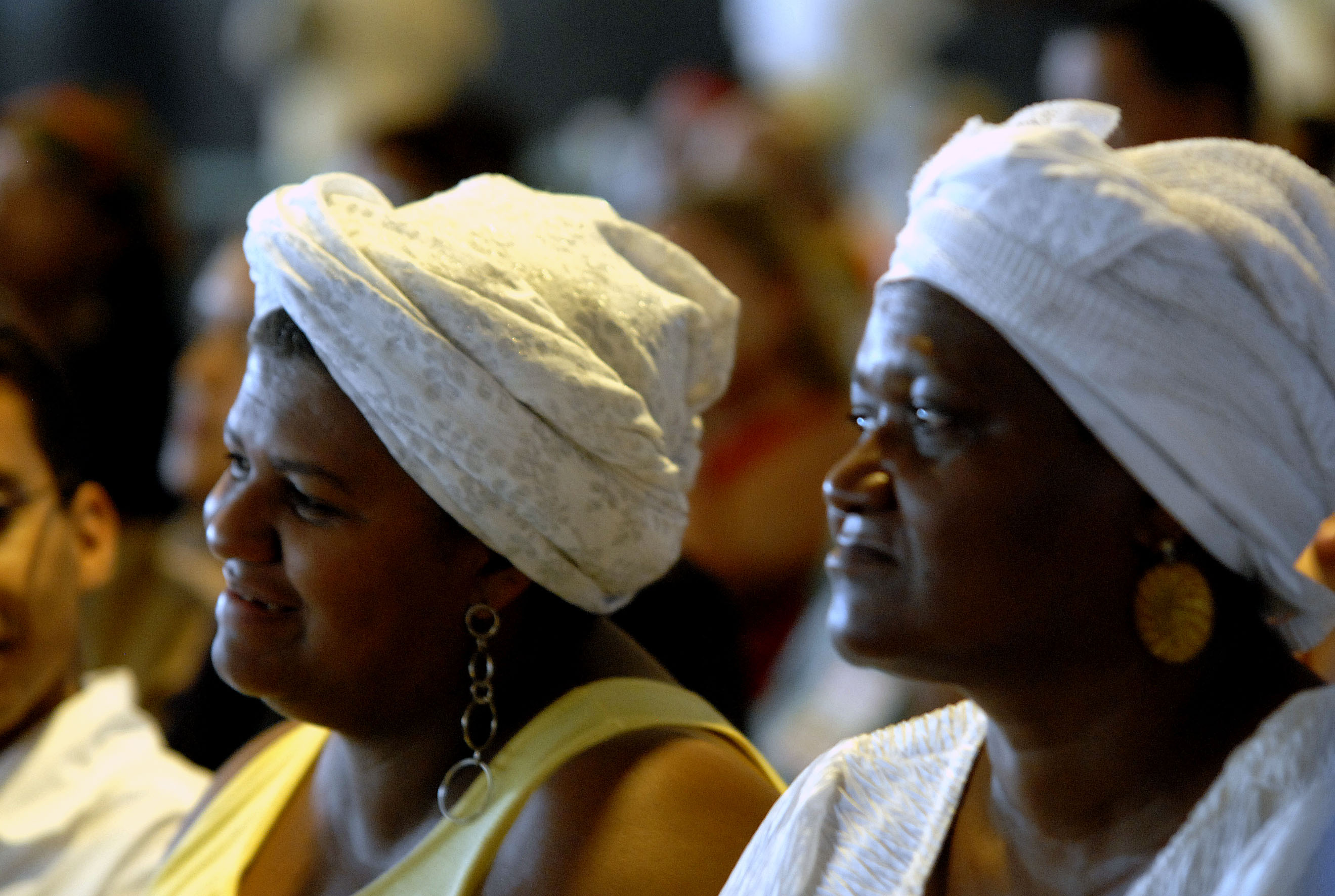
Brazilian quilombolas during a meeting in Brasília, 2007

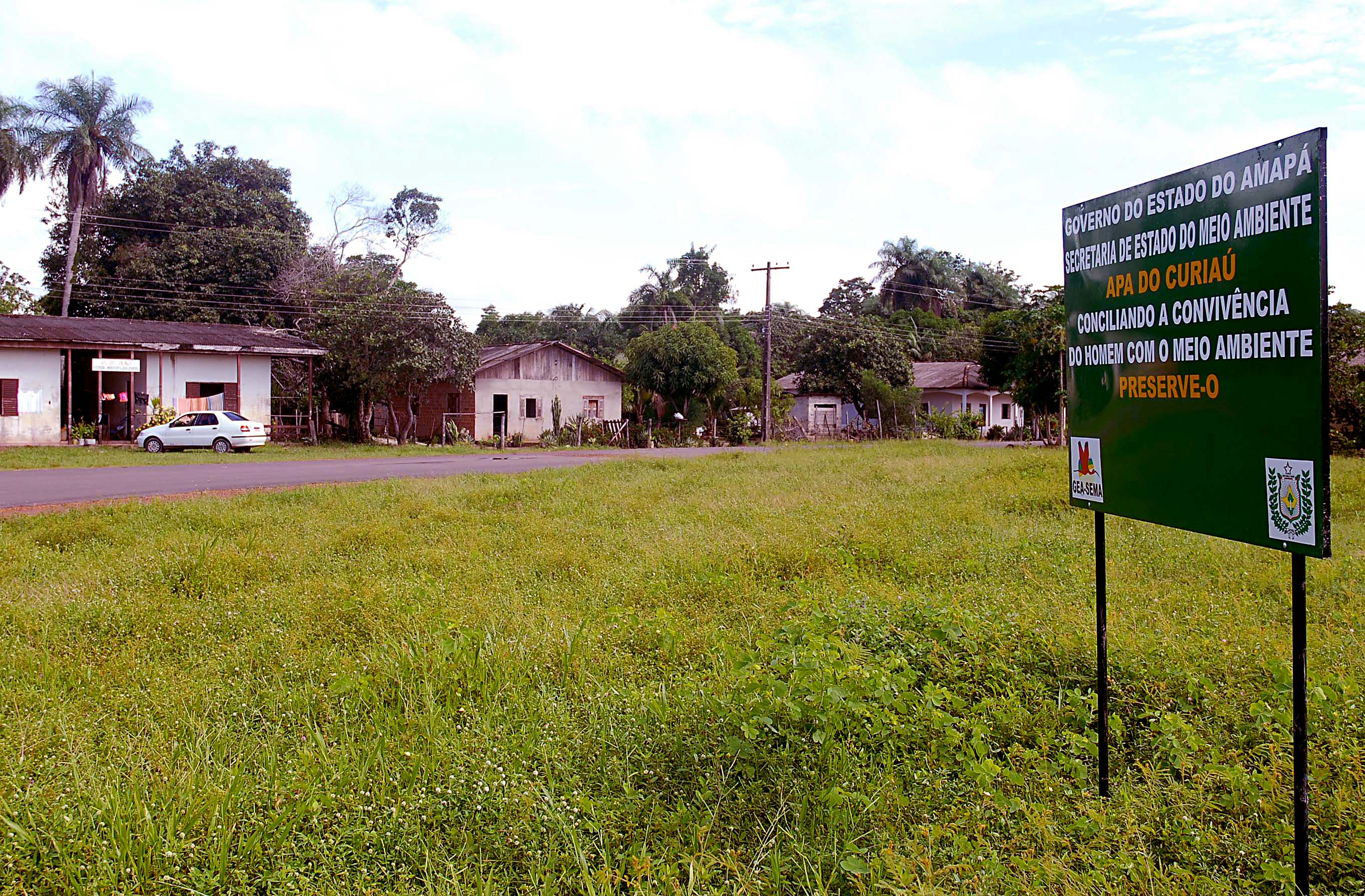
A quilombo in Amapá

A quilombo (Portuguese pronunciation: [kiˈlõbu]; from the Kimbundu word kilombo, lit. 'war camp') is a Brazilian hinterland settlement founded by people of African origin, and others sometimes called Carabali. Most of the inhabitants of quilombos, called quilombolas, were maroons, a term for escaped slaves. Documentation about refugee slave communities typically uses the term mocambo for settlements, which is an Ambundu word meaning "war camp". A mocambo is typically much smaller than a quilombo. Quilombo was not used until the 1670s, primarily in the more southerly parts of Brazil. In Colombia, such villages or camps were called palenques. Its inhabitants are palenqueros. They spoke various Spanish-African-based creole languages such as Palenquero.

Quilombos are classified as one of the three basic forms of active resistance by enslaved Africans. They also regularly attempted to seize power and conducted armed insurrections at plantations to gain amelioration of conditions. Typically, quilombos were a "pre–19th century phenomenon". In the first half of the 19th century in Brazil, enslaved people typically took armed action as part of their resistance. The colony was undergoing both political transition, as it fought for independence from Portugal, and new tensions associated with an increased slave trade, which brought in many more native-born Africans who resisted slavery.

== Etymology ==
The word quilombo originates from African languages of the Bantu language family, specifically the terms kilombo (from Kimbundu) and ochilombo (from Umbundu), spoken by peoples of south-central Africa in areas corresponding to the present-day territory of Angola. In pre-colonial Africa, these terms generally referred to temporary camps, resting places, or settlements associated with collective migrations, commercial activities, and warfare.

The kilombo, a fortified town surrounded by a wooden palisade, appeared among Imbangala warriors, which would soon be used in Brazil by freed Angolan slaves.

Historical and anthropological studies indicate that, in certain contexts, the term kilombo also referred to military associations or initiatory societies composed of young warriors, particularly among the Umbundu people and groups known in historiography as Imbangalas or jagas, which were characterized by strict internal discipline and collective organization. It is therefore widely believed that the term establishes a link between settlements and the culture of West Central Africa from where the majority of slaves were forcibly brought to Brazil. This African concept did not, however, correspond to a fixed form of territorial organization, but rather to flexible social arrangements adapted to specific situations of war, migration, or trade.

In the context of Portuguese America, beginning in the 16th century, the term was redefined by colonial authorities to refer to communities formed by escaped enslaved Africans and their descendants, thereby taking on a legal and administrative meaning associated with repression and social control. Over time, the word acquired its own meaning in Brazil, distinct from its original African connotations, becoming a historically situated term linked to experiences of resistance, territorialization, and social organization within the colonial slave system.

=== Other meaning in Spanish ===
In South American Spanish of the Southern Cone, the word quilombo has come to mean brothel; in Argentina, Bolivia, Honduras, Paraguay, and Uruguay, a mess, noise or disorder; in Venezuela, a remote or out-of-the-way place.

== History ==
=== Background: Slavery in Brazil ===
Legal slavery was present in Brazil for approximately three centuries, with the earliest known landing of enslaved Africans taking place 52 years after the Portuguese were the first Europeans to set foot in Brazil in 1500. The demand for enslaved Africans continued to increase through the 18th century, even as the Brazilian sugar economy ceased to dominate the world economy. In its place, commodity crops such as tobacco increased in prominence.

During the sugar boom period (1570–1670), the sugar plantations in Brazil presented hellish conditions, including the personal brutality of enslavers and the whip-wielding overseers in their employ. Physical torture was common for minor infractions. There was high physical exertion on workers, especially during harvest season. In addition, enslaved people were held to nearly-impossible daily production quotas while having to contend with lack of rest and food. Economically, in sugar plantations, it was cheaper for owners of enslaved Africans to work them to death and get new replacement slaves. Conditions were so bad that even the Crown intervened on at least two occasions, forcing plantation owners to provide the people they enslaved with sufficient food.

=== Quilombo in the early modern period ===
See Atlantic slave trade for a comprehensive presentation of slavery in Brazil.

Settlements were formed by enslaved Africans who escaped from plantations. Some enslavers, such as Friedrich von Weech, regarded the first escape attempt as a part of the "breaking in" process for new slaves. The first escape attempt would be punished severely as a deterrent for future escapes. Enslaved people who tried to escape a second time would be sent to slave prisons, and those who tried a third time would be sold. In general, slaves who were caught running away were also required to wear an iron collar around their necks at all times, in addition to the punishment they received.

Not all those who escaped slavery formed settlements in Brazil. Escaping from a life of slavery was a matter of opportunity. Settlements were formed in areas with dense populations of formerly enslaved people, like Pernambuco, where the biggest collection of mocambos formed the quilombo that became Palmares. While many quilombos were formed in rural areas such as Palmares, some were formed inside of cities, such as the Quilombo do Leblon inside of Rio de Janeiro. Some, among them Mahommah G. Baquaqua, escaped to New York because his multiple attempts at escape and suicide led to him being sold to a ship's captain.

Many quilombos were near Portuguese plantations and settlements. To keep their freedom, they were active both in defending against capitães do mato and being commissioned to recapture other runaway slaves. At the same time, they facilitated the escape of even more enslaved persons. For this reason, they were targets of the Dutch, then Portuguese colonial authorities and, later, of the Brazilian state and enslavers.

People of the quilombos would form a working government, and the community did not just consist of Africans but also of Native South Americans and even whites who were fleeing society or the law.

Despite the atmosphere of cooperation between some quilombos and the surrounding Portuguese settlements, they were almost always eventually destroyed. Seven of ten major quilombos in colonial Brazil were terminated within two years of formation. Some mocambos that were farther from Portuguese settlements and the later Brazilian cities were tolerated and still exist as towns today, with their dwellers speaking Portuguese creole languages.

=== Constitution of Brazil ===
Article 68 of the 1988 Constitution of Brazil granted the remaining quilombos the collective ownership of the lands they had occupied since colonial times. As of 2016, 294 villages have applied to be recognized as quilombos, because they were founded by escaped enslaved people and are mainly inhabited by their descendants. The certification process thus far has been slow, and 152 villages have been recognized as quilombos.

=== Similar phenomena in other locations ===
The quilombos constituted a social phenomenon embedded in the broader context of the slave-holding Atlantic world, manifesting themselves in different regions of the Americas under various names, such as palenques and cimarrones in areas of Spanish colonization, maroons in the English-speaking Caribbean, and marrons in Haiti. Despite regional differences, these communities shared structural characteristics, such as their formation from enslaved African populations and their descendants, the pursuit of territorial autonomy, and the development of their own forms of social organization in interaction—often conflictual—with colonial societies.

== Social organization ==
The formation of quilombos in colonial Brazil occurred through multiple channels and was not limited exclusively to the collective escape of enslaved Africans. Historiography has shown that these communities also emerged through the purchase of land by freed people, the occupation of abandoned areas, the settlement on former rural estates in decline, and the incorporation of socially marginalized groups, such as Indigenous peoples, poor whites, and enslaved people belonging to different owners. This diversity of origins resulted in equally varied forms of social and territorial organization.

In the case of the Quilombo dos Palmares, its formation was strongly associated with large-scale escape and the gradual aggregation of African and Afro-descendant populations throughout the 17th century. Palmares was structured as a confederation of population centers—often called mocambos—organized under relatively centralized forms of political authority.

In contrast, the Quilombo do Campo Grande, formed in Minas Gerais throughout the 18th century, developed from a more decentralized and geographically dispersed organizational structure, held together by networks of kinship, neighborhood ties, and shared interests—particularly the refusal to comply with the per capita tax system.

From an economic standpoint, both Palmares and Campo Grande based their livelihoods on agriculture, gathering, hunting, and trade with the surrounding society. While Palmares had a more concentrated territorial base, which favored continuous agricultural production, Campo Grande combined agricultural practices with strategies of mobility and reoccupation of the territory, adapted to the instability caused by colonial repression.

In both cases, the land was predominantly used collectively, organized according to criteria of kinship, solidarity, and reciprocity, although there were internal distinctions regarding access to resources, political authority, and productive responsibilities.

More recent historiographical studies have highlighted that some quilombos exhibited internal forms of social hierarchy and mechanisms of coercion related to the organization of labor. In certain contexts, there are records of individuals subjected to relationships of dependence or captivity within quilombo communities, a phenomenon that has been interpreted in various ways by historians.

These relationships did not constitute a direct and systematic reproduction of the colonial slave system, but must be understood within the context of societies formed under extreme external pressure, marked by the need for territorial defense, internal discipline, and the maintenance of social cohesion. The existence of hierarchies and forms of compulsory labor in some quilombos reveals the complexity of these historical experiences, refuting interpretations that view them as homogeneous or fully egalitarian societies.

A comparison between Palmares and Campo Grande shows that there was no single model of quilombo organization. These experiences represent historically situated responses to distinct economic, political, and territorial contexts, demonstrating the diversity and adaptability of quilombo populations within the colonial slave system.

== Quilombos ==
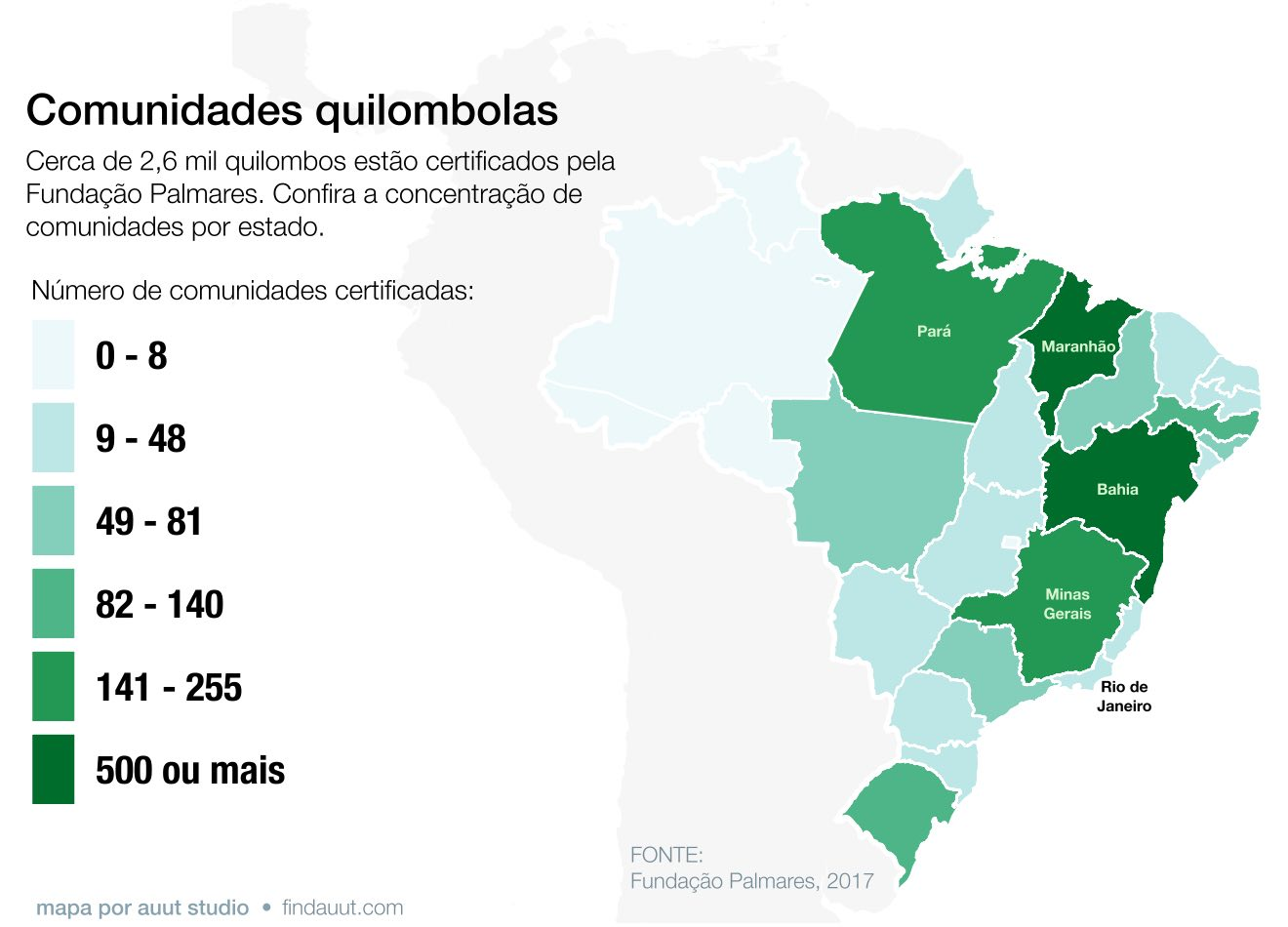
Map of Quilombo communities by state in Brazil (2017)

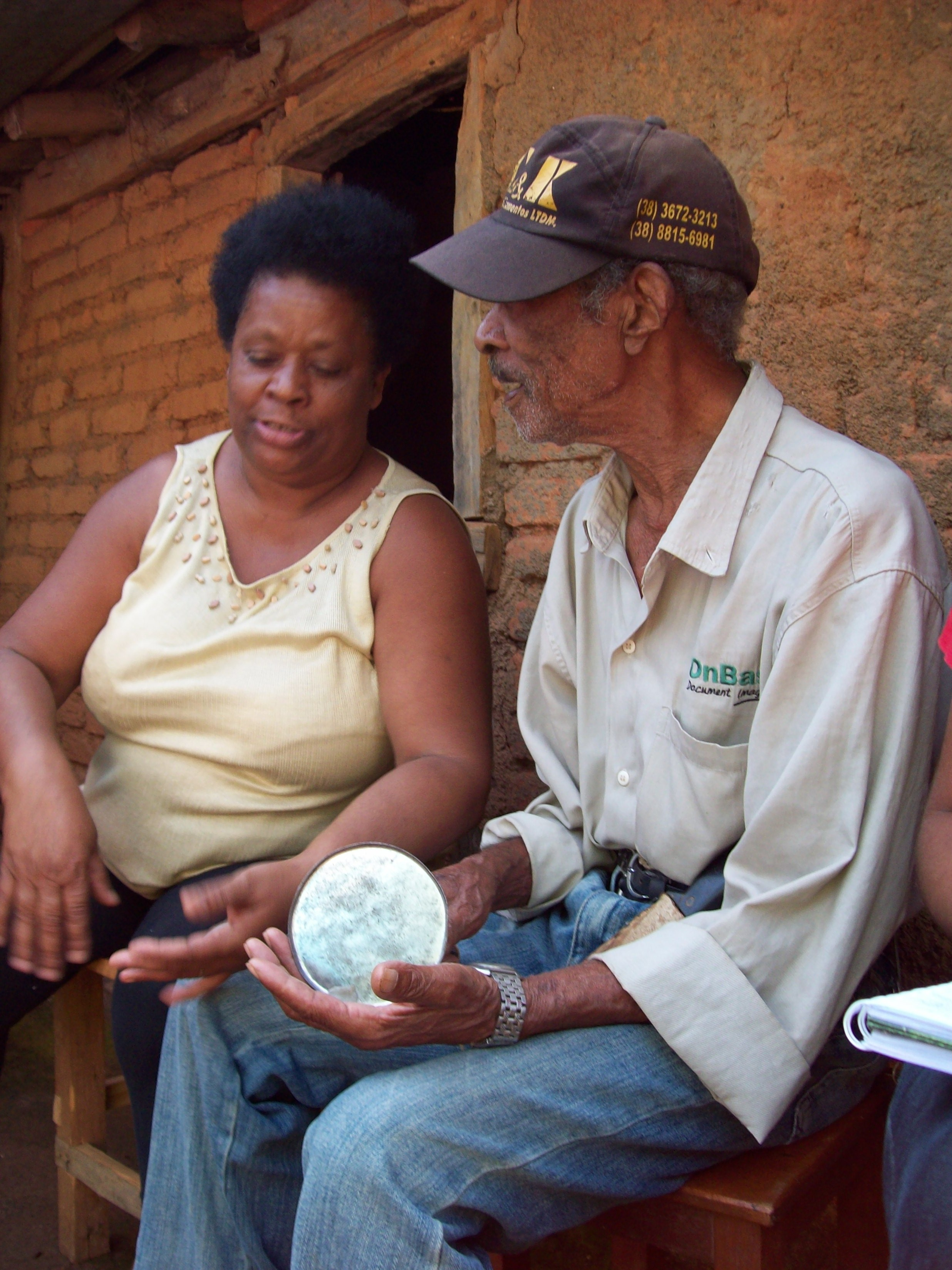
Residents of the Quilombo community of São Domingos in Paracatu, Minas Gerais

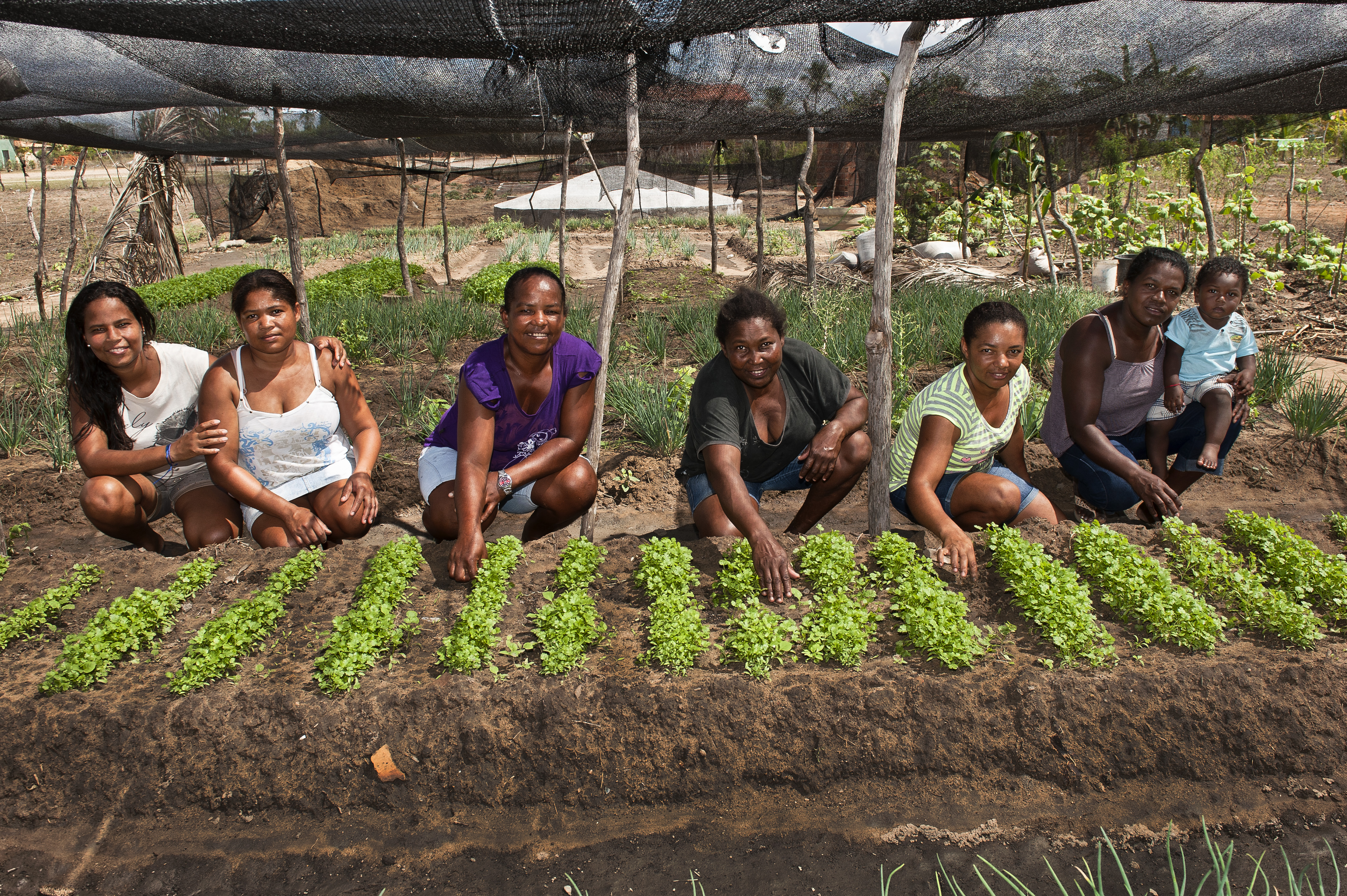
The Quilombola women of Biritinga who participate in the community association are beneficiaries of the Bolsa Família program.

Seven of the ten major quilombos in colonial Brazil were destroyed within two years of being formed. Four fell in Bahia in 1632, 1636, 1646 and 1796. The other three met the same fate in Rio in 1650, Parahyba in 1731, and Piumhy in 1758.

One quilombo, in Minas Gerais, lasted from 1712 to 1719. Another, the "Carlota" of Mato Grosso, was wiped out after existing for 25 years, from 1770 to 1795.

There were also a number of smaller quilombos or mocambos. The first reported quilombo was in 1575 in Bahia. Another quilombo in Bahia was reported at the start of the seventeenth century. Between 1737 and 1787, a small quilombo thrived in the vicinity of Sao Paulo.

There were also reports of mocambos in 1591 in Jaguaripe, in 1629 in Rio Vermelho, in 1636 in Itapicuru, in 1640 in Rio Real, in 1663 in Cairu, in 1723 in Camamu, in 1741 in Santo Amaro, in 1763 in Itapao, and 1797 in Cachoeira. All of these mocambos were in the Bahia region. The Buraco de Tatu mocambo thrived for 20 years between 1743 and 1763. It was located between Salvador and Itapoa until it was eventually destroyed by a force led by Joaquim da Costa Cardozo.

The region of Campo Grande and São Francisco was often populated with quilombos. In 1741, Jean Ferreira organised an expedition against a quilombo, but many runaways escaped capture. In 1746, a subsequent expedition captured 120 members of the quilombo. In 1752, an expedition led by Pere Marcos was attacked by quilombo fighters, resulting in significant loss of life.

Quilombos continued to form in the 19th century. In 1810, a quilombo was discovered at Linhares in Sao Paulo. A decade later, another was found in Minas. In 1828, another quilombo was discovered at Cahuca, near Recife, and a year later, an expedition was mounted against another at Corcovado, near Rio. In 1855, the Maravilha quilombo in Amazonia was destroyed.

=== Palmares ===
The most famous quilombo was Palmares, an independent, self-sufficient community near Recife, established in about 1600. Palmares was massive and consisted of several settlements with a combined population of over 30,000 citizens, mostly blacks. It was to survive almost an entire century.

Part of the reason for the massive size of the quilombo at Palmares was because of its location in Brazil, at the median point between the Atlantic Ocean and Guinea, an important area of the African slave trade. Quilombo dos Palmares was an autonomous community of escaped enslaved people from the Portuguese settlements in Brazil, "a region perhaps the size of Portugal in the hinterland of Bahia".

In 1612, the Portuguese tried in vain to take Palmares in an expedition that proved to be very costly. Palmares thrived in the years of peace that followed the 1640s. In 1640, a Dutch scouting mission found that the self-freed community of Palmares was spread over two settlements, with about 6,000 living in one location, and another 5,000 in another. Dutch expeditions against Palmares in the 1640s were similarly unsuccessful.

At its height, Palmares had a population of over 30,000. In the 1670s, when the Portuguese tried to take control of half of Palmares, it was estimated that the palmarista population of that half was between 15,000 and 20,000. Between 1672 and 1694, Palmares withstood, on average, one Portuguese expedition nearly every year.

Ganga Zumba and Zumbi are the two best-known warrior-leaders of Palmares which, after a history of conflict with first Dutch and then Portuguese colonial authorities, finally fell to a Portuguese artillery assault in 1694.

In Brazil, both men are now honored as heroes and symbols of black pride, freedom, and democracy. As his birthday is unknown, Zumbi's execution date, November 20, is observed as Dia da Consciência Negra or "Black Awareness Day" in the states of Rio de Janeiro and São Paulo, and his image has appeared on postage stamps, banknotes, and coins.

=== Mola ===
The Mola quilombo comprised approximately 300 formerly enslaved people and had a high degree of political, social, and military organization. Felipa Maria Aranha was the first leader of the community. The group was also led by Maria Luiza Piriá. It was organised as a republic, with democratic voting in place. Over the course of the Mola quilombo's life, it expanded to include four other similar settlements in the region; it was known as the Confederação do Itapocu. In 1895, there were still traces of the settlement to be seen; as of 2020, they had disappeared.

=== Curiaú ===
In 1992, the Rio Curiaú Environmental Protection Area was established for the inhabitants of Curiaú de Dentro, Curiaú de Fora, Casa Grande, Curralinho and Mocambo. The area is located near the capital Macapá and measures 21,676 hectares (53,560 acres). As of 1999, the protected area is home to about 1,500 people.

=== Cunani ===
Even though Cunani is better known as the capital of the unrecognised Republic of Independent Guiana, it has been designated a quilombo settlement, and therefore, has been given territory similar to the indigenous territories.

== Popular culture ==
- The 1963 film Ganga Zumba depicts the life of Ganga Zumba, leader of the Palmares quilombo.
- A 1984 historical epic film entitled Quilombo depicts the rise and fall of Palmares. Directed by Carlos Diegues, it chronicles the lives of Ganga Zumba and Zumbi.

== See also ==
- Garifuna people
- San Basilio de Palenque
- Slave revolts in Brazil
- Slave states and free states
- Suscia
- Zambo

== Sources ==
- Almeida, Alfredo Wagner Berno de (2002). Os quilombos e as novas etnias (in Brazilian Portuguese). Rio de Janeiro: Editora FGV.
- Anjos, Rafael Sanzio Araújo dos (2011). Territorialidade Quilombola: Fotos & Mapas (in Brazilian Portuguese). Brasília: Mapas Editora & Consultoria.
- Anjos, Rafael Sanzio Araújo dos (2017). "Territórios Quilombolas: Geografias, Cartografias e Conflitos Institucionais". Revista EIXO (in Brazilian Portuguese). 6 (2): 1–12.
- Associação Brasileira de Antropologia (1994). "Documento do Grupo de Trabalho sobre Comunidades Negras Rurais". Revista da ABA (in Brazilian Portuguese): 81–82.
- Anjos, Rafael Sanzio Araújo dos (2009). Quilombos: Geografia Africana - Cartografia Étnica - Territórios Tradicionais (in Brazilian Portuguese). Brasília: Mapas Editora & Consultoria.
- Desch-Obi, M. Thomas J. (2008). Fighting for Honor: The History of African Martial Art Traditions in the Atlantic World. Columbia: University of South Carolina Press. ISBN 978-1-57003-718-4.
- Florentino, Manolo; Amantino, Márcia (2012). "Uma morfologia dos quilombos nas Américas, séculos XVI-XIX". História, Ciências, Saúde - Manguinhos (in Brazilian Portuguese). 19 (1): 259–297. doi:10.1590/S0104-59702012000500014.
- Gomes, Flávio dos Santos (2015). Mocambos e quilombos: uma história do campesinato negro no Brasil (in Brazilian Portuguese). São Paulo: Claro Enigma.
- Gomes, Flávio dos Santos (2018). Quilombos e remanescentes de quilombos (in Brazilian Portuguese). São Paulo: Companhia das Letras.
- Martins, Tarcísio José (2008). Quilombo do Campo Grande: a história de Minas que se devolve ao povo (in Brazilian Portuguese). Contagem: Santa Clara.
- Moura, Clóvis (1987). Os quilombos e a rebelião negra (in Brazilian Portuguese). São Paulo: Brasiliense.
- Munanga, Kabengele (1996). "Origem e histórico do quilombo na África". Revista USP (in Brazilian Portuguese) (28): 56–63.
- Reis, João José (1996). Quilombos e revoltas escravas no Brasil (in Brazilian Portuguese). São Paulo: Edusp.
