= Antônio Pompêo =

Brazilian actor

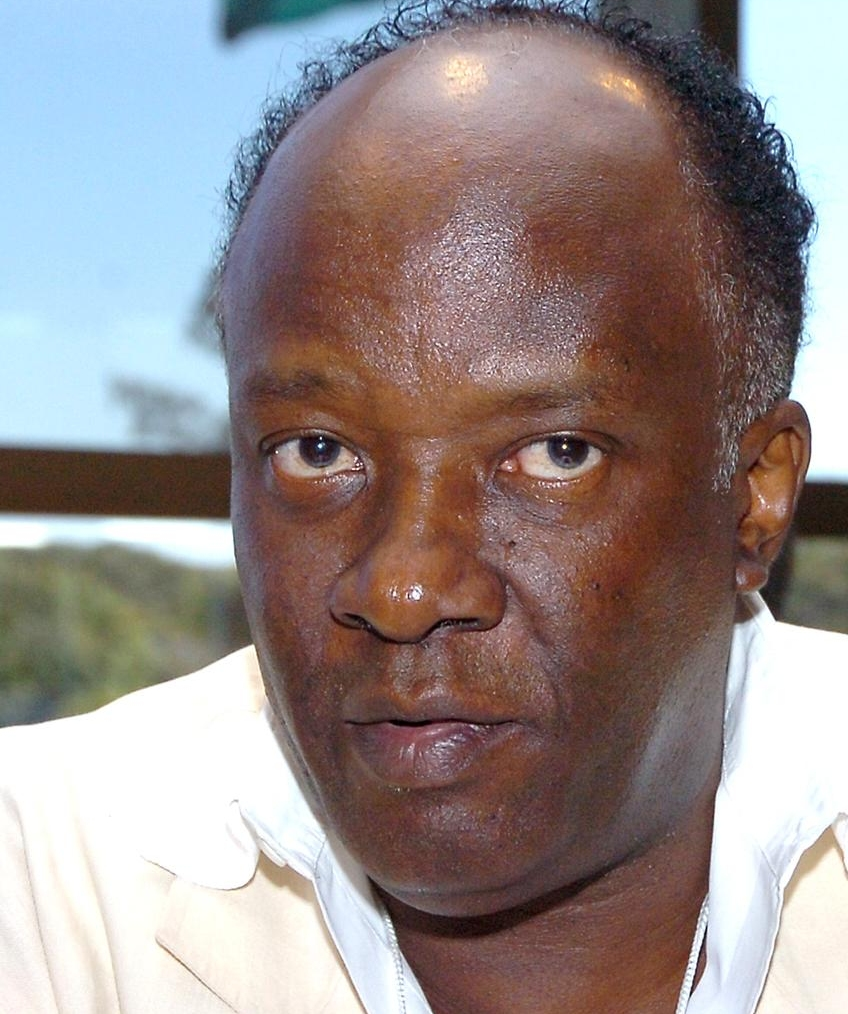
Pompêo in June 2007.

Antônio Pompêo (23 February 1953 – 5 January 2016) was a Brazilian actor. He appeared in the television shows Balacobaco, Rebelde, A Casa das Sete Mulheres, O Rei do Gado, Mulheres de Areia and Pedra sobre Pedra. He also appeared in the films Xica (1976), Quilombo (1985), A Samba for Sherlock (2001) and Que sera, sera (2002). He was born in São José do Rio Preto or São José do Rio Pardo, São Paulo.

Pompêo was found dead in his apartment on 5 January 2016 in Rio de Janeiro, aged 62.
