= Suscia =

Suscia (or Sussa, Suça, Súcia, Sussia) is a folk dance from the state of Tocantins in Brazil. It is most predominant in cities like Peixe, Natividade and Arrais. The exact name of the dance is unknown, as every community has a slight variation of the word. There is also controversy around when and where the dance originated from. Some locals say that the Suscia was created by African slaves brought to the area by gold miners. After the workday was over, the slave owners would allow their subjects to dance. Others believe that the dance originated in the Quilombo itself. Quilombos were small villages inhabited by escaped slaves, a symbol of slave rebellion. Whatever the origin of this dance may be, it has deep African slave roots and it is part of Brazilian history.

Suscia is mostly danced during religious celebration in the region, especially the Festa do Divino Espírito Santo, which is a monthlong festival. Suscia is a frenetic sensual dance, where one male and one female hops in circles in very close proximity of each other. Others stand around in a big loop singing a ditty and clapping to the sound of drums. Everyone takes his or her turn in the center of the circle. A man from the outside circle taps the male dancer and takes his spot in the center then a woman from the loop taps the female dancer and takes her spot next. Suscia is so engraved on the culture of the area that the church does not mind the sexual nature of the dance and rather encourages this tradition.

No electric instruments are used, only vocal, drums and the occasional string guitar. The people from the area usually build their own drums, made by chopping down a tree, making it hollow by burning the wood and attaching a cowhide to one of the ends.

Most of the songs have only a few verses and the majority of them are about flirting. For example, the most popular one is a ditty with only one verse called “Formiga que doi e jiquitaia”, which translates to “When an ant bite, it is jiquitaia”. This song is danced by the dancers scratching their bodies as if they have thousands of ants crawling over them. People from the area say that this dance originated one day when people were dancing on top of an ant farm and the singers noticed that people started to scratch themselves so instead of stopping the music they just incorporated to their repertoire and kept on dancing.

Suscia is very particular to this area of Brazil but its tradition is dying out. In order to try to keep this dance alive in the country of samba, the government of the state of Tocantins has been sponsoring Suscia dance contests yearly to get the younger generation involved.
