= Ganga Zumba =

Ganga Zumbi

King of Quilombo dos Palmares
- Predecessor: Princess Aqualtune of Kongo
- Successor: Zumbi dos Palmares (nephew)
- Born: Ganga Zumba (original name is written in Kikongo as Nganga Nzumbi), ca. 1630; Kingdom of Kongo
- Died: 1678; Cucaú Valley, Portuguese Colony of Brazil
- Spouse: Three wives
- House: Kongo
- Mother: Princess Aqualtune of Kongo
- Occupation: Prince in Africa, Slave, warrior, King of Palmares in Brazil

Nganga Nzumba (Portuguese pronunciation: [ˈɡɐ̃ɡɐ ˈzũbɐ]) (c. 1630 - 1678) was the first leader of the massive runaway slave settlement of Quilombo dos Palmares, or Angola Janga, in the present-day state of Alagoas, Brazil. Zumba was enslaved and escaped bondage on a sugar plantation and eventually rose to the position of highest authority within the kingdom of Palmares, and the corresponding title of Ganga Zumba.

== The name ==
Although some Portuguese documents regard Ganga Zumba as his proper name, and this name is widely used today, the most important of the documents translates the name as "Great Lord." In Kikongo, nganga a nzumbi was "the priest responsible for the spiritual defense of the community" which was a kilombo or military settlement made up multiple groups.

A letter written to him by the governor of Pernambuco in 1678 and now found in the Archives of the University of Coimbra, calls him "Ganazumba," which is a better translation of "Great Lord" (in Kimbundu).

== Early life ==
Ganga is said to have been the son of princess Aqualtune, daughter of an unknown king of Kongo. She led a battalion at the Battle of Mbwila.

The Portuguese won the battle, eventually killing 5,000 men and capturing the king, his two sons, his two nephews, four governors, various court officials, 95 title holders and 400 other nobles, who were put on ships and sold as slaves in the Americas. It is likely that Ganga was among these captives.

The whereabouts of the rest of them is unknown. Some are believed to have been sent to Spanish America, but Ganga Zumba, his Brother Zona and his sister Sabina (mother of Zumbi dos Palmares, his nephew and successor) were made slaves at the plantation of Santa Rita in the Portuguese Captaincy of Pernambuco in what is now northeast Brazil, which at the time was controlled by the Dutch. From there they escaped to Palmares.

== Quilombo ==
A quilombo or mocambo was a refuge of runaway slaves who were forcibly brought to Brazil (from present-day Angola, Democratic Republic of Congo, and Congo-Brazzaville) that escaped their bondage and fled into the interior of Brazil to the mountainous region of Pernambuco. As their numbers increased, they formed maroon settlements.

Gradually as many as ten separate mocambos had formed and ultimately coalesced into a confederation called the Quilombo of Palmares, or Angola Janga, under a king, Ganga Zumba or Ganazumba, who may have been elected by the leaders of the constituent mocambos. Ganga Zumba, who ruled the biggest of the villages, Cerro dos Macacos, presided the mocambo's chief council and was considered the King of Palmares.

The nine other settlements were headed by brothers, sons, or nephews of Ganga Zumba. Zumbi was chief of one community and his brother, Andalaquituche, headed another.

== Ganga Zumba's rule ==
By the 1670s, Ganga Zumba had a palace, three wives, guards, ministers, and devoted subjects at his royal compound called Macaco. Macaco comes from the name of an animal (monkey) that was killed on the site. The compound consisted of 1,500 houses which housed his family, guards, and officials, all of which were considered royalty. He was given the respect of a Monarch and the honor of a Lord.

In 1678 Zumba accepted a peace treaty offered by the Portuguese Governor of Pernambuco, which required that the Palmarinos relocate to Cucaú Valley. In the treaty, the Portuguese confirmed their acceptance of Zumba as the supreme leader of his people.

In 1679, the treaty was challenged by Zumbi, one of Ganga Zumba's nephews, who led a revolt against him. Zumbi also rebelled against the Portuguese attempts to redistribute Palmares land among Portuguese officers.

In the confusion that followed, Ganga Zumba was poisoned, most likely by one of his own relatives for entering into a treaty with the Portuguese. It is reported that Joao the "mulatto", Gaspar and Amaro were responsible for killing Zumba.

Many of his followers who had moved to the Cucaú Valley were re-enslaved by the Portuguese. Resistance to the Portuguese then continued under Zumbi.

== Legacy ==
The Brazilian film Ganga Zumba was made in 1963 but was not released until 1972 because there was a military coup in Brazil in 1964, and films about revolutions, even those taking place in the 17th century, were considered politically dangerous. The film is based on João Felício dos Santos's novel, and focuses on a black slave who ends up in Palmares. The film is about black liberation and keeps a black racial perspective.

== See also ==
- List of slaves
