= União dos Palmares =

Municipality of Alagoas, Brazil

- Municipality

- Flag Coat of arms
- Nickname: Terra da Liberdade (Land of Freedom)
- Location of União dos Palmares in the State of Alagoas

- Location in Brazil
- Coordinates: 09°09′46″S 36°01′55″W
- Country: Brazil
- State: Alagoas
- Founded: October 13, 1831

Area
  - Total: 427.825 km^{2} (165.184 sq mi)
- Elevation: 155 m (509 ft)

Population (2020)
  - Total: 65,790
  - Density: 153.72/km^{2} (398.1/sq mi)
- Demonym: palmarino
- Time zone: UTC−3 (BRT)
- Website: Official website (on 2012-11-25 the above official website address produces a page 'Not Found' message) www.uniaodospalmaresal.com.br (on 2012-11-25 the above website address appears to present itself as the website for the municipal government)

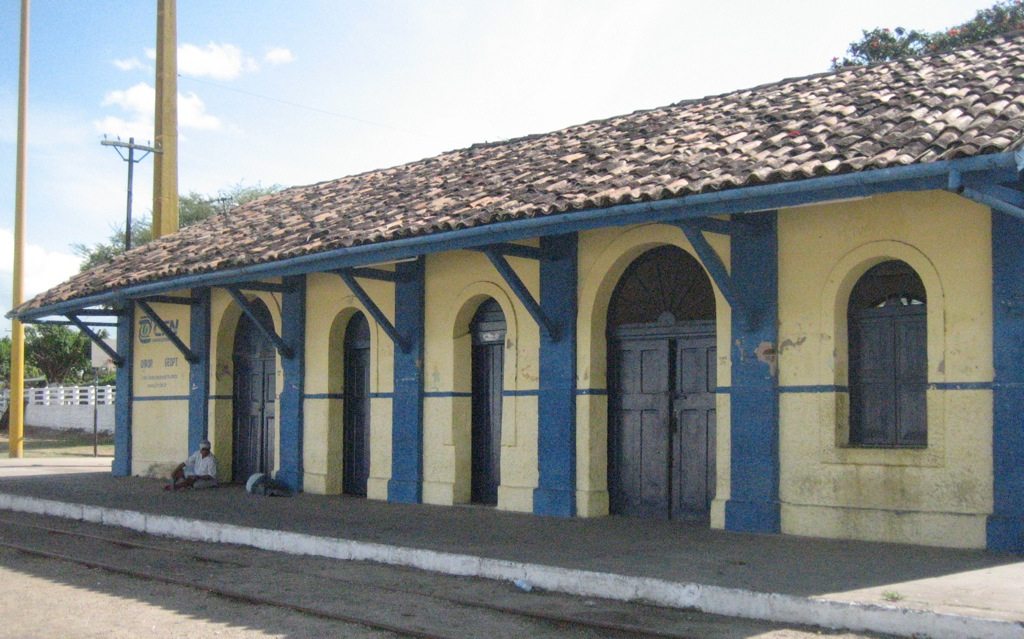
Photograph of the União dos Palmares rail station taken 16 October 2008.

União dos Palmares (Central northeastern portuguese pronunciation: [uniˈɐ̃w ˈduɦ pawˈmɐɾi(s)]) is a municipality located in the Brazilian state of Alagoas. Its population was 65,790 (2020) and its area is 428 km^{2} (165 sq mi). Surrounding agricultural land is largely dedicated to sugar cane and cattle. At one time, when the city was an active rail stop with regular passenger service, it was named simply União due to its rail junction joining Alagoas and Pernambuco. The name was changed in 1944 to reflect its historic significance. The city is increasingly seeing domestic and foreign tourist drawn by historical and natural features that are now protected in Parque Nacional Serra da Barriga and Parque Memorial Quilombo dos Palmares.

== History ==
The city of União dos Palmares has a historic importance to Afro-Brazilians. On a nearby hill was a mocambo or, in more recent terms, a quilombo. These were centers of African slaves fleeing and resisting slavery. Known as the Quilombo dos Palmares this was the largest and most organized of the many quilombos in Brazil. The most famous figure of the Quilombo dos Palmares was Zumbi dos Palmares. The quilombo reached a population somewhere around 30,000 composed of former slaves and some Amerindian allies. Between 1672 and 1696 it withstood repeated attacks by colonial forces until it fell to regular forces with artillery.

== Present Day Relationship to History ==
The city is the gateway to the Parque Memorial Quilombo dos Palmares in the Parque Nacional Serra da Barriga and described as "A Terra da Liberdade" (The land of liberty). Memorial celebrations attract visitors and the park is a natural area preserving endangered Atlantic semi-deciduous forests of the Mata Atlântica. The park attracts visitors both domestic and foreign to tourist accommodations around the city. The park and city were given publicity by a 20 November 2003 ceremonial opening by the President of Brazil.
