= National Day of Zumbi and Black Consciousness =

Annual celebration honoring the Black community in Brazil

Black Consciousness Day
- Official name: National Day of Zumbi and Black Consciousness
- Also called: Zumbi Day; Black Consciousness Day; sometimes mistranslated into English as Black Conscience or Black Awareness
- Observed by: Brazil
- Type: National
- Date: 20 November
- Next time: 20 November 2026
- Frequency: Annual

In Brazil, the National Day of Zumbi and Black Consciousness (Portuguese: Dia Nacional de Zumbi e da Consciência Negra), also known simply as Black Consciousness Day (Portuguese: Dia da Consciência Negra), is observed every year on 20 November. Conceived in 1971 by poet and activist Oliveira Silveira and the Porto Alegre–based Grupo Palmares, the date was incorporated into the national school calendar in 2003, recognized as a national commemorative date in 2011, and established as a national public holiday on 21 December 2023.

The occasion is dedicated to reflecting on the value and contributions of Afro-Brazilians and to debates about racism, discrimination, social equality and inclusion, as well as Afro-Brazilian and African culture. The date was chosen to honor the death of Zumbi of the Quilombo dos Palmares (1695), highlighting Black protagonism in Brazilian history.

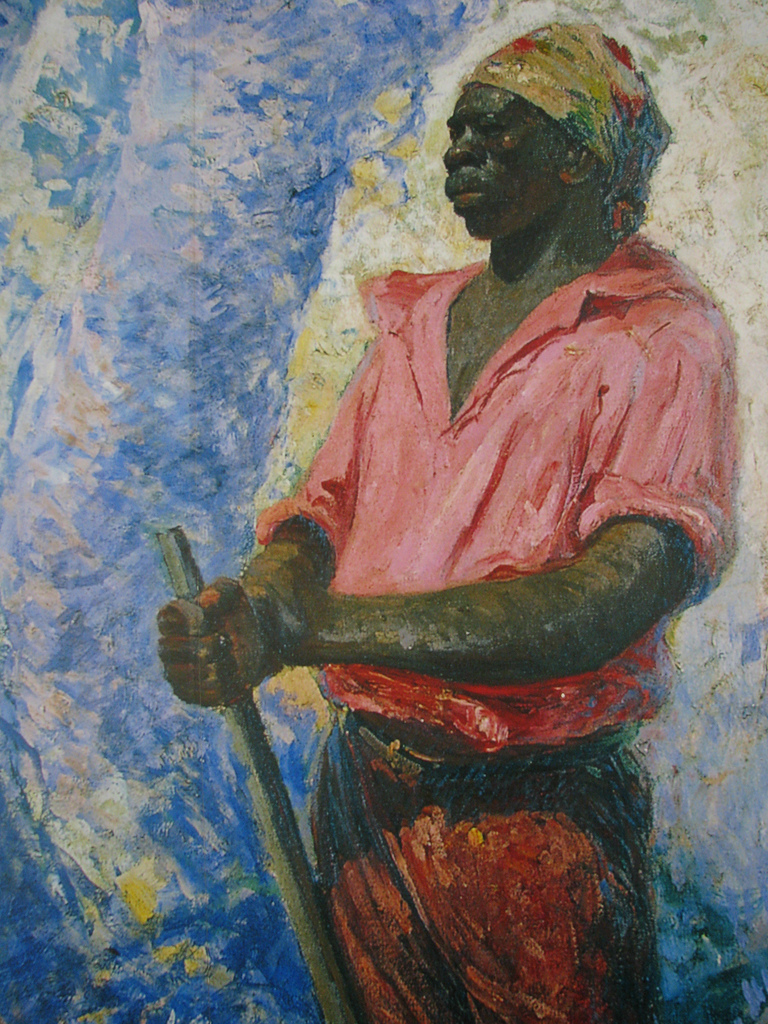
Zumbi by Antônio Parreiras.

== History ==
=== Origins ===
The idea of celebrating 20 November emerged amid Black social movements against racism in the 1970s. In 1971, in Porto Alegre, Oliveira Silveira proposed the date within the Grupo Palmares, an association of activists and researchers of Black Brazilian culture. Drawing an analogy with the remembrance of Tiradentes on the date of his death, Silveira argued for commemorating Zumbi's death to center Black agency in national memory. A magazine by Editora Abril listed 20 November as the date of Zumbi's death, which inspired the group's choice; the proposal was approved by members Vilmar Nunes, Ilmo da Silva and Antônio Carlos Côrtes.

Two years after the first celebration, the group's challenge to the traditional 13 May date reached national news, and events honoring overlooked Black historical figures began to spread across the country every November. In 1978, the Unified Black Movement (MNU, Movimento Negro Unificado) included Black Consciousness Day in a manifesto, marking the success of the proposal and the end of Grupo Palmares' activities.

=== Censorship under the military regime ===
The proposal arose during the military dictatorship, three years after AI-5. When a newspaper announced the 20 November 1971 commemoration under the headline "Zumbi – The homage of the theater's Black people," authorities reportedly confused "Grupo Palmares" with the armed organization VAR-Palmares. The group was summoned by the Federal Police and required to submit the full program to obtain approval by censors.

== Significance ==
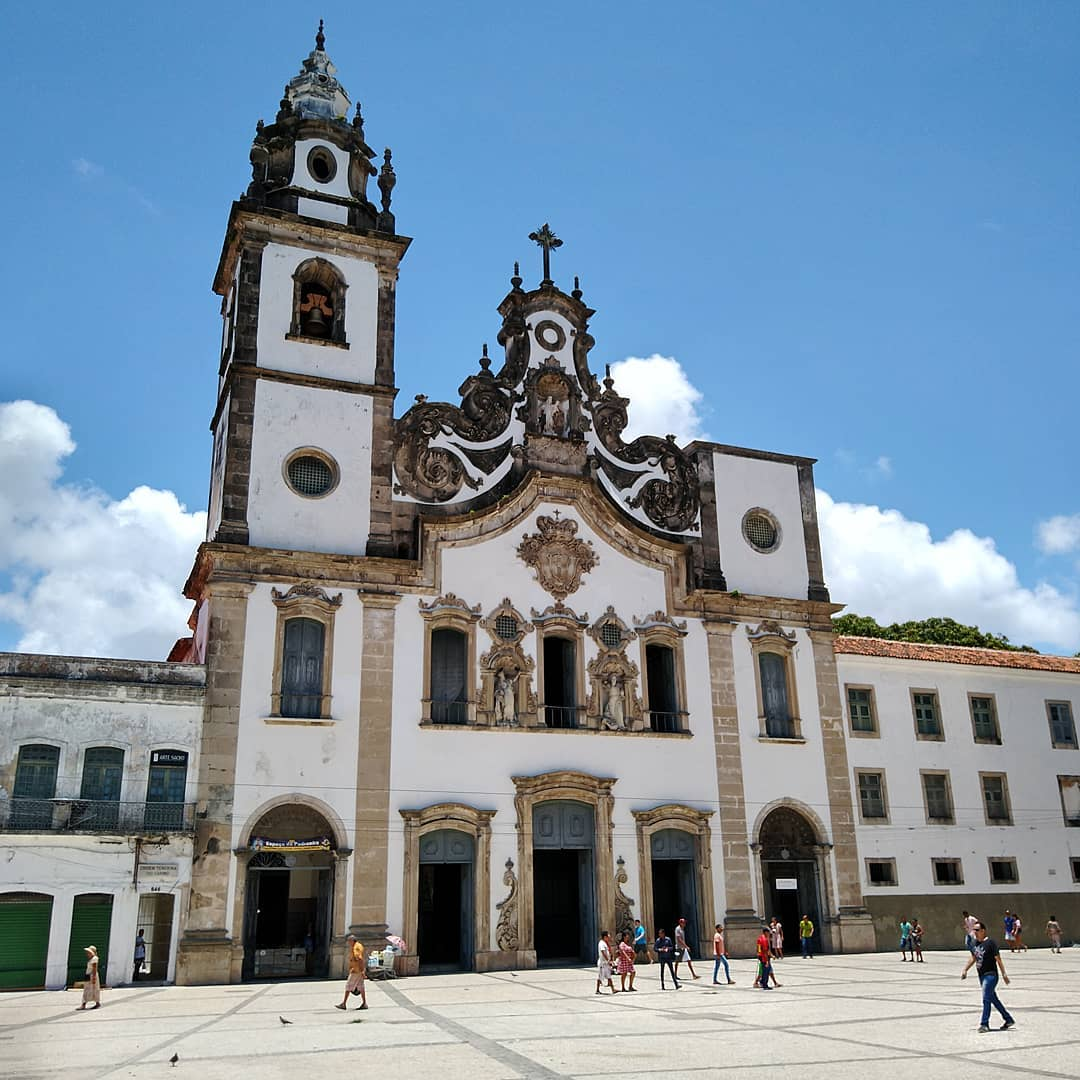
Pátio do Carmo, Recife, where Zumbi's head is said to have been displayed until complete decomposition.

The day symbolizes resistance and recognition of the African ancestry that shaped Brazil, through the homage to the leader of the Quilombo dos Palmares, Zumbi, killed in an ambush in 1695 after repeated colonial assaults. Zumbi has been listed in the Livro dos Heróis da Pátria at the Tancredo Neves Pantheon of the Fatherland and Freedom since 1997. Each year the Coordenação Nacional de Entidades Negras organizes the traditional Marcha Zumbi dos Palmares, with themes focused on the struggles and interests of the Black community.

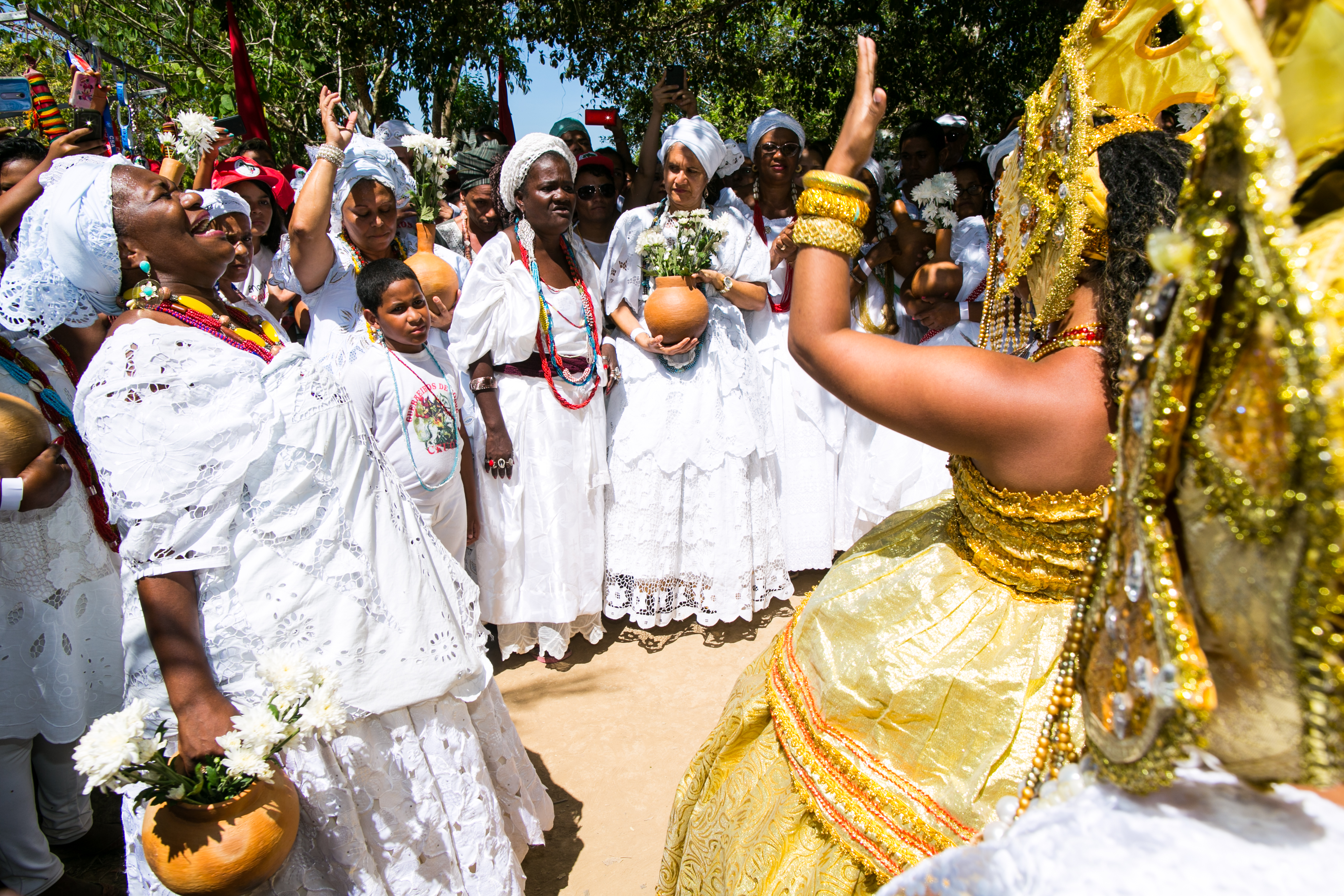
Commemorations on the Serra da Barriga, site of the Quilombo dos Palmares.

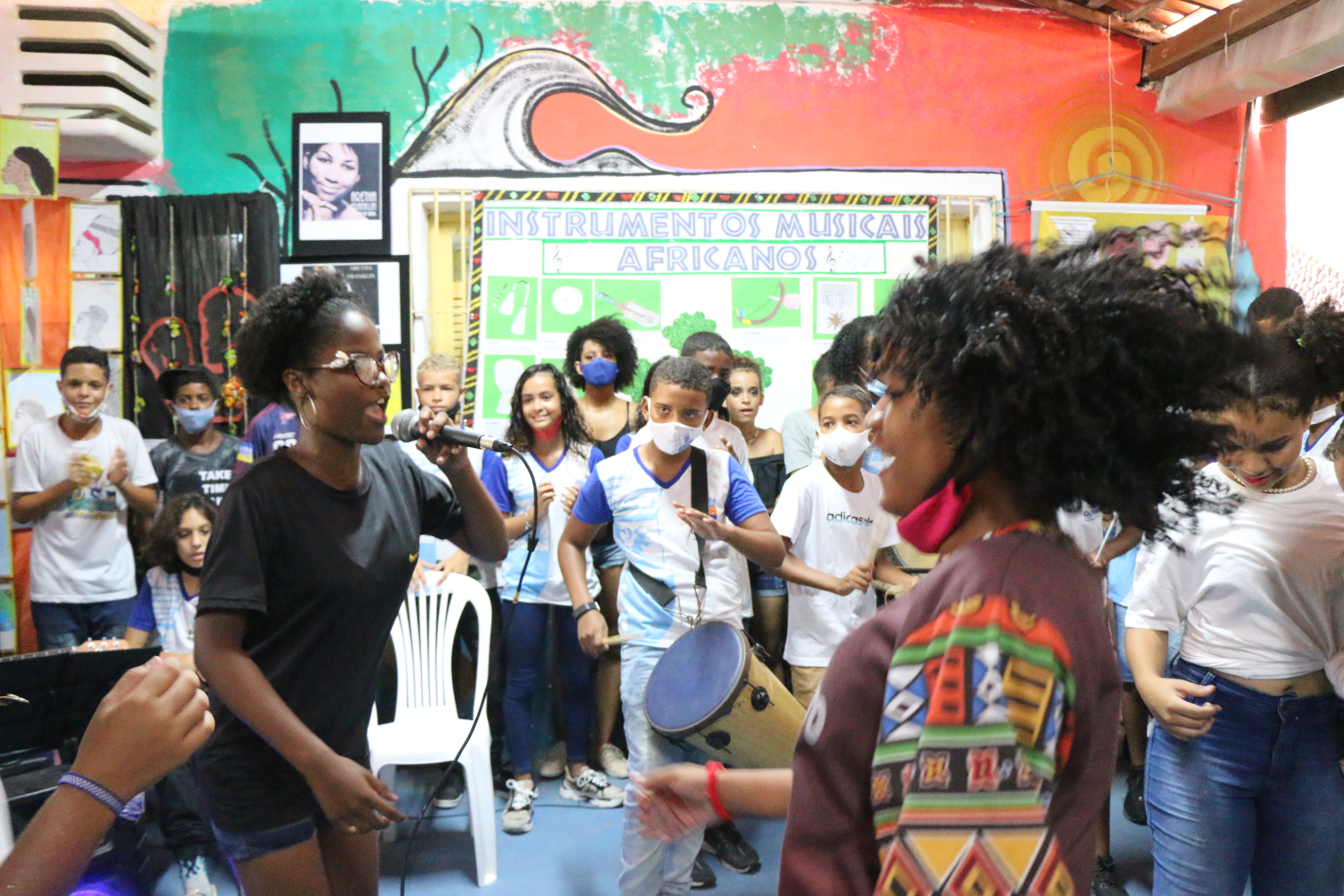
Afro-Brazilian musical group performing at a school in Olinda, Pernambuco.

== Official recognition and public holiday ==
A similar federal proposal (PL 1442/2003) was introduced in 2003 but archived in 2009.

Under President Luiz Inácio Lula da Silva's first administration, Law No. 10,639/2003 added Black Consciousness Day to school calendars and mandated instruction on History and Afro-Brazilian Culture in the national curriculum for public and private schools, including African history, the struggle of Black people in Brazil and the role of Black Brazilians in national formation. In 2008, the Ministry of Education assessed that implementation lagged, due to a lack of training not only for teachers but also for principals and coordinators.

Law No. 12,519/2011 subsequently instituted National Zumbi and Black Consciousness Day to be commemorated each 20 November. A bill to make the date a national holiday advanced in the Senate in September 2021 and was approved by the Chamber of Deputies in 2023; it was enacted as Law No. 14,759 on 21 December 2023.

Before the federal law, several states and over a thousand municipalities had already declared local holidays. Alagoas established the state holiday in 1995. In 2002, Rio de Janeiro (Law No. 4,007 of 11 November) and Mato Grosso (Law No. 7,879 of 27 December) did so as well, followed by Amapá in 2007 (Law No. 1,169) and Amazonas in 2010 (Law No. 84 of 8 July 2010). In Rio Grande do Sul, where Grupo Palmares operated, Law No. 8,352 of 11 September 1987 included the date in the official calendar (but not as a holiday). Also in 1987, São Paulo established Black Consciousness Month in November (Law No. 5,680 of 21 May).

A 2014 survey by the Secretariat for Policies to Promote Racial Equality reported that 1,044 municipalities regulated the holiday locally. In São Paulo state alone it is a municipal holiday in the capital and more than 100 other cities.

== Events and themes ==
Commemorations commonly include courses, seminars, workshops, public hearings and marches, as well as school and community activities aimed at valuing Afro-Brazilian and African culture and combating racism. Topics often include ethnic identity, equality in the labor market and Black pride.

== See also ==
- International Day for the Elimination of Racial Discrimination
- International Day of Remembrance of the Victims of Slavery and the Transatlantic Slave Trade
- International Day for the Abolition of Slavery
- Nelson Mandela International Day
- Afro-Colombian Day
- Black History Month
- International Decade for People of African Descent
