= Felipa Maria Aranha =

Founder and leader of the Mola quilombo

Leader of the Mola quilombo
- In office ? - c. 1780

Personal details
- Born: c. 1720 Gold Coast, Guinea
- Died: c. 1780 Brazil
- Occupation: Rebel leader

Felipa Maria Aranha (c.1720 – c.1780) was a rebel leader as the Leader of the Mola quilombo-community in Brazil. She was enslaved in Guinea as a child, who escaped slavery and became the leader of the Mola quilombo in Pará, Brazil. Her leadership enabled the community to resist the incursions of slave-owners and Portuguese troops. She is remembered by the remaining quilombolas and the Brazilian black community as an inspirational figure in their history.

== Biography ==
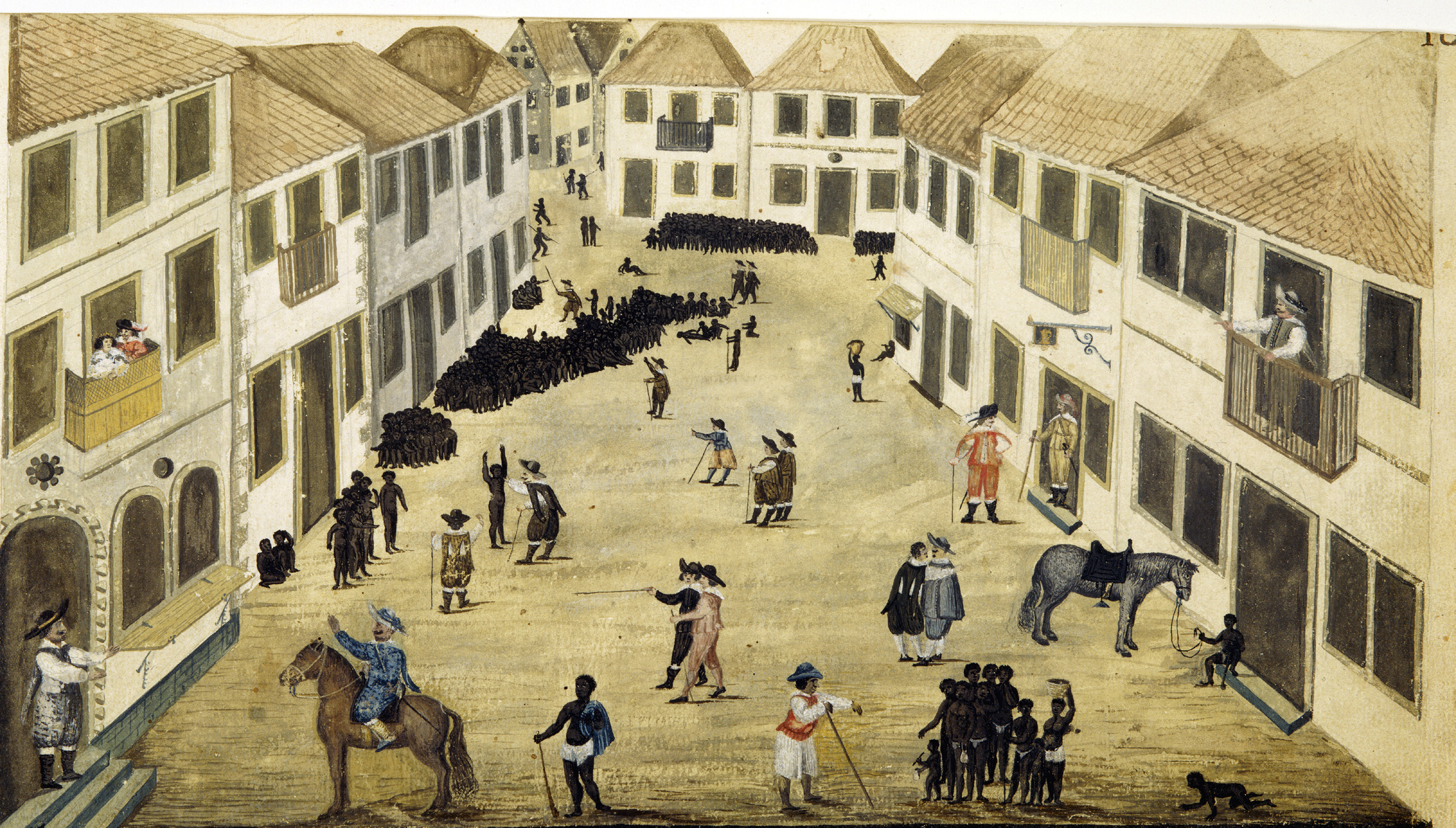
Zacharias Wagner - Mercado de escravos no Recife

It is thought that Aranha was born in the Costa da Mina (Gold Coast) region of what is now Guinea. She was probably born between the years 1720 and 1730. She would have been enslaved as a child, around 1740. It is likely she was sold as a slave in the square of Santa Maria de Belém do Grão in Pará; the identity of the person who purchased her is unknown. Aranha was sent to Cametá, where she was forced to work as a slave on a sugarcane plantation. It is not known how she managed to escape, however, with hundreds of others, she managed to form one of the largest and best structured quilombos in Brazil at Mola, a site at the headwaters of the Itapocu River.

The Mola quilombo consisted of approximately 300 formerly enslaved people and had a high degree of political, social and military organization. Aranha was the first leader of the community. The group was also led by Maria Luiza Piriá. It was organised as a republic, with democratic voting in place. Over the course of the Mola quilombo's life, it expanded to include four other similar settlements in the region and was known as the Confederation of Itapocu. In 1895 there were still traces of the settlement to be seen; they have now disappeared.

== Historiography ==
Historians, such as Benedita Pinto and Flávio Gomes, interpret the organisation of the group as an ideal model of resistance to slavery. Aranha herself is seen as an inspirational leader and is increasingly viewed as a feminist role model.

== Legacy ==
In 2017 the poet Jarid Arraes published an eight-page work about her life. In 2020 a virtual exhibition entitled Exposicao Heroinas com Moldura was hosted in Brazil to honour of the International Day of Latin American and Caribbean Black women; it featured the life of Aranha.
