= Ganga Zumba (film) =

1963 film directed by Carlos Diegues

- Directed by: Carlos Diegues
- Screenplay by: Leopoldo Serran; Rubem Rocha Filho; Carlos Diegues
- Based on: Novel by João Felício dos Santos
- Starring: Antonio Pitanga; Lea Garcia; Eliezer Gomes
- Release date: 16 April 1963
- Country: Brazil

Ganga Zumba is a Brazilian film made in 1963 by Carlos Diegues and released in the USA in 1972 about slavery in Brazil. It portrays the escape of a group of slaves who hope to bring the next leader to the Quilombo dos Palmares. Its soundtrack was composed by Moacir Santos and played by Nara Leão, with African rituals and dance performed by the Sons of Gandhy group. It was filmed in accurate locations as proposed by the Cinema Novo. Also present in the movie were the musicians Cartola and Dona Zica.

Based on a book written by João Felício dos Santos, Ganga Zumba, the movie discusses the context of sugar production in the Brazilian Northeast during the 1600s, when slaves would flee from the Portuguese plantations and create their own villages, highlighting the Quilombo do Palmares' role in this process.

== Plot ==
In a sugarcane plantation in Pernambuco, in the 17th century, Antão is a young slave born in the below decks of a slave ship which brought his mother, a captive, to the Portuguese colony of Brazil. When he is older, he is told that his mother (who by then had already passed away) had been a queen, and that he was destined to become Ganga Zumba, African king. The wise and old slave Sororoba tells him also about Palmares, a free kingdom hidden in the hills and protected by the Orisha Oshosi, formed by runaway slaves.

Palmares' king, Zambi, who was in constant war against the whites, had just lost his son and, upon learning of Antão's existence, wanted him to become Palmares's new leader. Sorobaba and others prepared his escape with the help of a guide sent by Zambi, and, together with his lover Cipriana, he flees. While on the road, they are spotted by Portuguese landowners from a neighbouring farm, but they manage to kill them, except for the slave Dandara. When, however, they stumble upon the river that was the designated meeting place with Zambi's warriors, they find no one. Eventually, they manage to find Palmares where they receive a king's welcome, despite pursuit by the slave hunter Tolentino da Rosa.

== Cast ==
- Antônio Pitanga as Ganga Zumba
- Léa Garcia as Cipriana
- Eliezer Gomes as Sororoba
- Luíza Maranhão as Dandara dos Palmares
