= Domingos Jorge Velho =

Portuguese explorer (1641–1705)

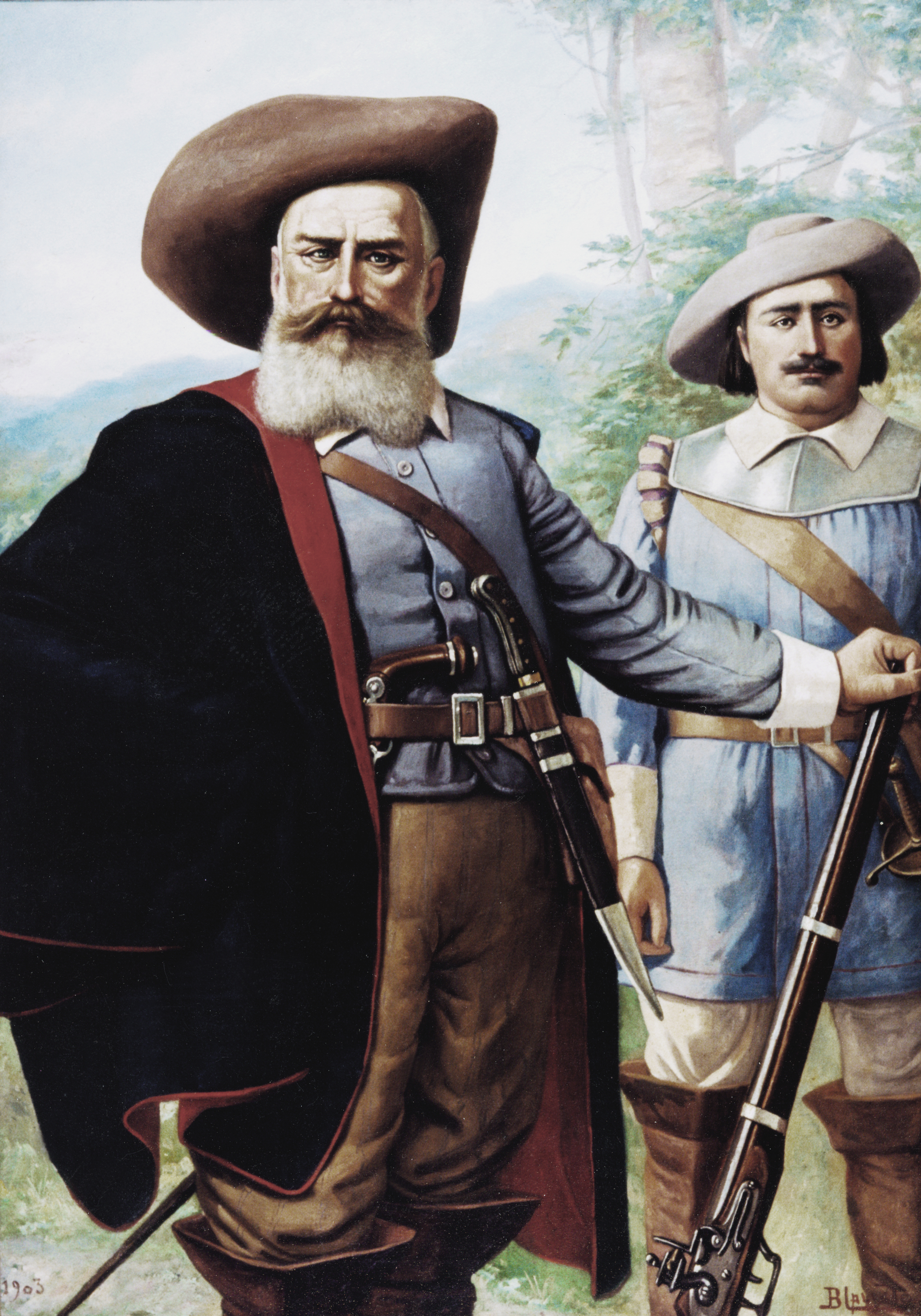
- Domingos Jorge Velho by Benedito Calixto (1903)
- Born: 1641; Santana de Parnaíba, Brazil, Portuguese Empire
- Died: 1705 (aged 63–64); Piancó, Brazil, Portuguese Empire
- Occupation: Bandeirante

Domingos Jorge Velho (c. 1641–1705) was a Portuguese bandeirante from Colonial Brazil. He was born in Santana de Parnaíba, captaincy of São Paulo, to Francisco Jorge Velho and Francisca Gonçalves de Camargo. He was responsible for the repression of several indigenous nations in Bahia and especially Piauí, which he is reputed to have been the first colonist to explore. His greater fame, however, is due to his conquest of the Quilombo dos Palmares, in the hinterland of Alagoas, on behalf of João da Cunha Souto Maior, governor of Pernambuco. Velho accepted the assignment and, in 1694, with an army of amerindians and mamelucos, overran the fortified city of Cerca do Macaco, on the Serra da Barriga mountain.

According to the bishop of Olinda at the time, he did not speak Portuguese fluently but rather the língua geral, a lingua franca based on Tupian languages spoken in Brazil at that time. However, John Manuel Monteiro, a specialist on the subject, in Os Negros da Terra, explains that Velho not only spoke Portuguese but was indeed literate: "actually Domingos not only spoke but he also wrote in Portuguese, what would be highly unusual for a Tapuia [...] Domingos even wrote a letter to the Portuguese King, and his recognizable signature can be identified frequently in the civil registries of Santana de Parnaíba". Velho is reputed to have had several amerindian concubines, but only married in old age. He died in Piancó, captaincy of Paraíba.

His uncle of the same name was married to Izabel Pires de Monteiro; the Captain Salvador Jorge Velho and Simão Jorge Velho were born out of this union.
