= Bernardo Vieira de Melo =

Brazilian governor (1658–1718)

Bernardo Vieira de Melo (1658–1718) was the first Governor of Rio Grande do Norte in the colony of Brazil.

== Family ==
Vieira was born in the parish of Muribeca (today Jaboatão dos Guararapes) in 1658, and began life as a colonial Brazilian backwoodsman. He was the son of Captain Bernardo Vieira de Melo and Maria Camelo de Melo, and grandson of António de Vieira Melo who arrived in Pernambuco, coming from Portugal in 1654, shortly after the Dutch invasion. He married Catarina Leitão, daughter of Captain Gonçalo Leitão Arnoso.

== Career ==
Vieira de Melo was one of the first sesmeiros in the area; in 1671, he was awarded a 20-league land grant.

Vieira entered the military in 1675 and was made a captain-general on November 17, 1691. On January 8, 1695, he was appointed Captain-General of Rio Grande do Norte and held the position until 1701.

On September 25, 1709 he was made Sergeant Major of the Third of Palmares, in which position he took an active part in War of the Mascates. Much of the land he conquered in Rio Grande was given by Vieira de Melo to various family members and other Portuguese elites to secure their support and to fortify and consolidate his own power.

In November 1710, Vieira was the first to call for the creation of a Republic in Brazil modeled on the Republic of Venice. For this, he was arrested in Recife in 1712 and shipped to Lisbon with his son, André. He died in the Limoeiro prison in 1718.

== See also ==
- Mascate War
- History of Pernambuco

Preceded by —	Governor of Rio Grande do Norte; 1697 — 1701	Succeeded by Antônio de Carvalho e Almeida
