= Mocambo (settlement) =

Colonial Brazilian communities of runaway slaves

The mocambos (from Portuguese mocambo, literally "huts") were village-sized communities mainly of runaway slaves in colonial Brazil. A mocambo differed from a quilombo in size; a quilombo, like the Quilombo dos Palmares, might embrace many distinct mocambos. The terms were not always used consistently, however, and sometimes wrongly used interchangeably.

== History ==
The most common form of slave resistance in Portugal's colony of Brazil was flight, and a characteristic problem of the Brazilian slave regime was the continual and widespread existence of fugitive communities called mocambos, ladeiras, magotes, or quilombos. The three major areas of colonial Brazil where the fugitive communities stayed were: the plantation zone of Bahia, the mining district of Minas Gerais, and the inaccessible frontier of Alagoas, site of Palmares, the largest fugitive community.

Mocambos mean exile communities established by formerly enslaved (fugitive) Brazilians between the 18th and 19th century. The purpose of these settlements was to protect the refugees from the Portuguese opposition. The main way they did so was being located in places that were difficult for the punitive military expeditions to find.

Mocambos were a threat to the economy and the social fabric of the slave regime, because as the colonial slave regime fed off the labor of the enslaved they turned the parasitic economy of the slave regime on its head, relying on theft, extortion and raiding to survive, though the minority of communities lived off agriculture and arms trade.

Mocambos did not submit to the control of the government, and because of the high percentage of the Brazilian population made up of enslaved people (around one third), the number and the importance of Mocambos was continually increasing. For this reason mocambos were targeted for annihilation by punitive military expeditions. When one was found the soldiers would execute all the adults and enslave any surviving children (born in the Mocambos), declaring them property of the leaders of the exterminating expeditions.

== Bahia: a plantation world ==
Runaway communities flourished in almost all areas of Bahia, whose geography aided escape, and the result was a great number of fugitives and mocambos.

In plantation zones, slaves often made up over 60 percent of the inhabitants. They lived in bad conditions in terms of food and housing and they had to deal with particularly cruel or sadistic masters. The region of Bahia, in which appeared a great quantity of mocambos, was the southern towns of Cairù, Camamù and Ilhéus. In these towns there was for the most part the production of manioc, the basic subsistence crop of Brazil.

A second and still unstudied method of slave control and capture in Brazil was the calculated use of Indians as slave catchers and as a counterforce to mocambos and possible slave resorts.

== About the book Maroon Societies ==
Maroon Societies is a systematic study of the communities formed by escaped slaves in the Caribbean, Latin America, and the United States. These societies ranged from small bands that survived less than a year to powerful states encompassing thousands of members and surviving for generations and even centuries. The volume includes eyewitness accounts written by escaped slaves and their pursuers, as well as modern historical and anthropological studies of the maroon experience.

For this edition, Richard Price has written a new preface reflecting recent changes in both maroon scholarship and in the lives of contemporary maroons throughout the Americas.
