= Serra da Barriga =

Place in Brazil

Coordinates: 9°10′12″S 36°5′17″W

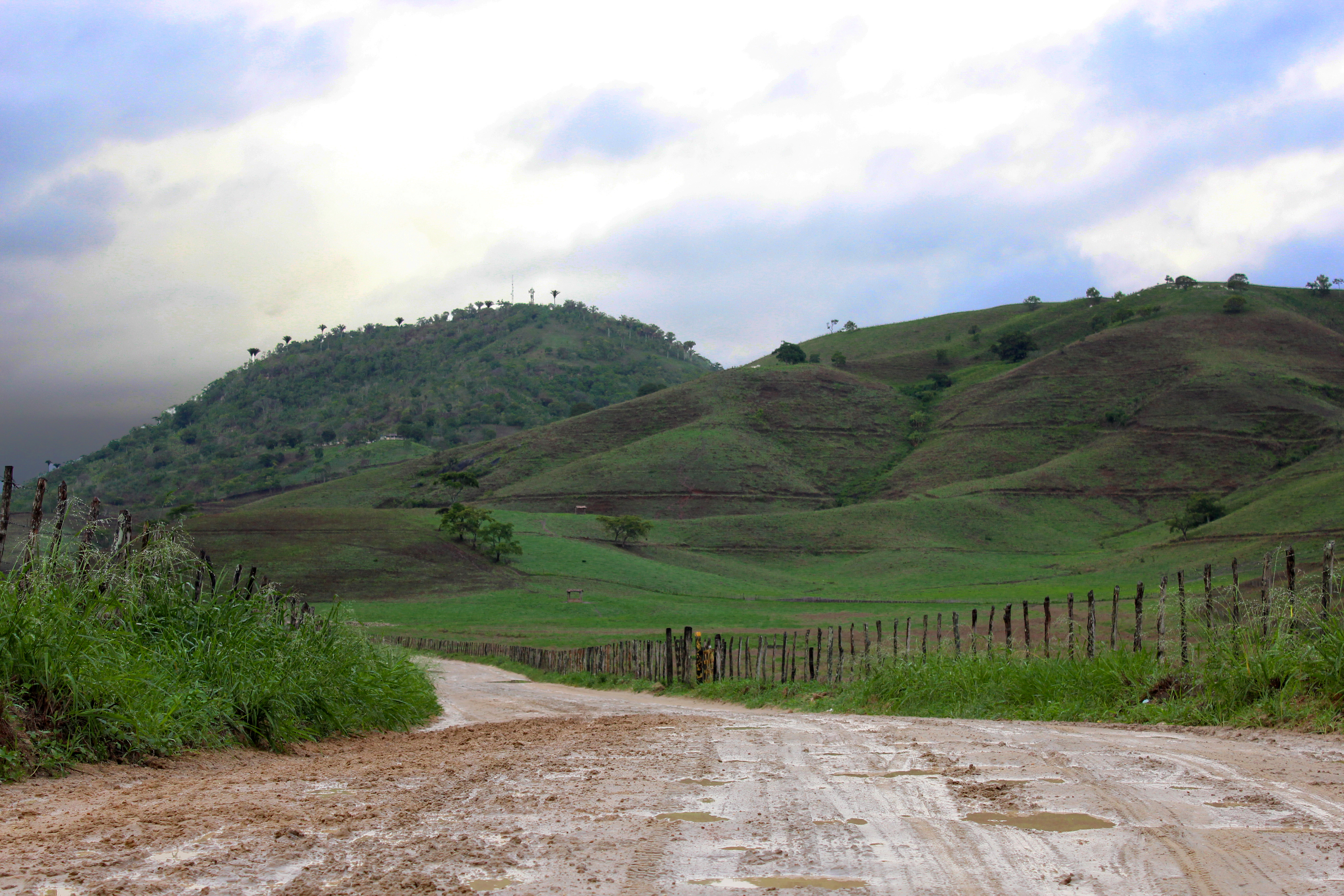
Serra da Barriga

Serra da Barriga is a mountain range located in the municipality of União dos Palmares, in the Brazilian state of Alagoas. It is best known for being the location of a fortified settlement known as Cerca do Macaco under the control of the Palmares, an established group of fugitives and escaped slaves. At the time of the Palmares, it was a part of the state of Pernambuco. The final assault on the mountain occurred in January 1694, and was led by the Portuguese Bandeirante Domingos Jorge Velho. The mountain was listed in the National Institute of Historic and Artistic Heritage (IPHAN) in 1986.

The Serra da Barriga is part of the Southern Borborema Plateau, a geomorphological unit with a hot and humid climate. The area occupied by the Serra da Barriga is the starting point of the Açucena creek, a tributary which flows to the Mundaú valley. It flows to the north of the mountain, and reaches 8.6 km in length.
