= History of Pernambuco =

Current flag of Pernambuco adopted from the 1817 Revolution flag.

The history of Pernambuco is the systematic study of the past of the State of Pernambuco in the Northeast region of Brazil. It can be roughly divided into two periods: first, when the region was a colony of Portugal and, second, when it was a component of the nation of Brazil. Not to be overlooked, however, are the established indigenous peoples of the region, numerous revolts and short-lived independence movements, French incursions, and a Dutch occupation.

Pernambuco was economically prosperous during its early history, first as a source of dye-wood and then sugar, but later languished becoming today a principal state in Brazil's underdeveloped Northeast Region. Following the expulsion of the Dutch from the region in 1654, there were numerous impediments to the development of the region, including a concentrated system of land ownership, its extensive reliance on a single crop, poor communication and transportation, and intense regionalism. In the late 20th century, the region again experienced some success as it developed an industrial sector and improved communication and transportation reduced the effects of regionalism.

== Name ==
Recent research indicates that the name Pernambuco was derived from Boca de Fernão (Fernão's Mouth). The place, now known as Canal de Santa Cruz, is where Fernão de Noronha loaded his ships with Brazilian wood to trade in Europe. The name was spoken by the Tupi as Pernãobuka and was recorded by French writers as Fernambouc; the two pronunciations have been combined into the modern name.

In the past, Pernambuco was believed to be a distortion of the Tupi words para-nã (wide river) and Mbuka (hollow or broken), referring to its coastal reefs.

== Prehistory and antiquity ==
The northeast section of Brazil has some of the country's oldest archaeological sites, dating back to 40,000 BC. In the region that today corresponds to Pernambuco, signs of human occupation from around 9,000 BC were identified in the regions of Chã do Caboclo, Bom Jardim, Furna do Estragon, and Brejo da Madre de Deus. In Brejo da Madre de Deus, an important necropolis was found, from which 83 skeletons were recovered.

The Itaparica people inhabited the region and were responsible for creating stone instruments around 4,000 BC. Cave paintings in the region from around AD 1 are attributed to the Kiriri people. Other indigenous groups from before Portuguese colonization such as the Pankararu and Atikum are still present in certain parts of Pernambuco. At the time of Portuguese colonization, the Tabajara, Tupinambá, and Caetés were recorded as inhabiting the area.

== Precolonial history ==
=== Indigenous peoples ===
At the time of the discovery of Brazil by Portugal, the area near Recife was populated chiefly by Tabajara Indians. The Tabajara were members of the Tupi-Guarani linguistic group. The Portuguese had more successful dealings with Tupi-Guarani speakers than with speakers of other languages. While the Portuguese found many cultural practices of indigenous peoples objectionable, such as cannibalism and nudity, the Tupi-Guarani were viewed as more valuable culturally than their counterparts. Whereas other indigenous groups were wholly hunter-gatherers, Tupi speakers, including the Tabajara, practiced limited agriculture.

=== Portuguese arrival ===
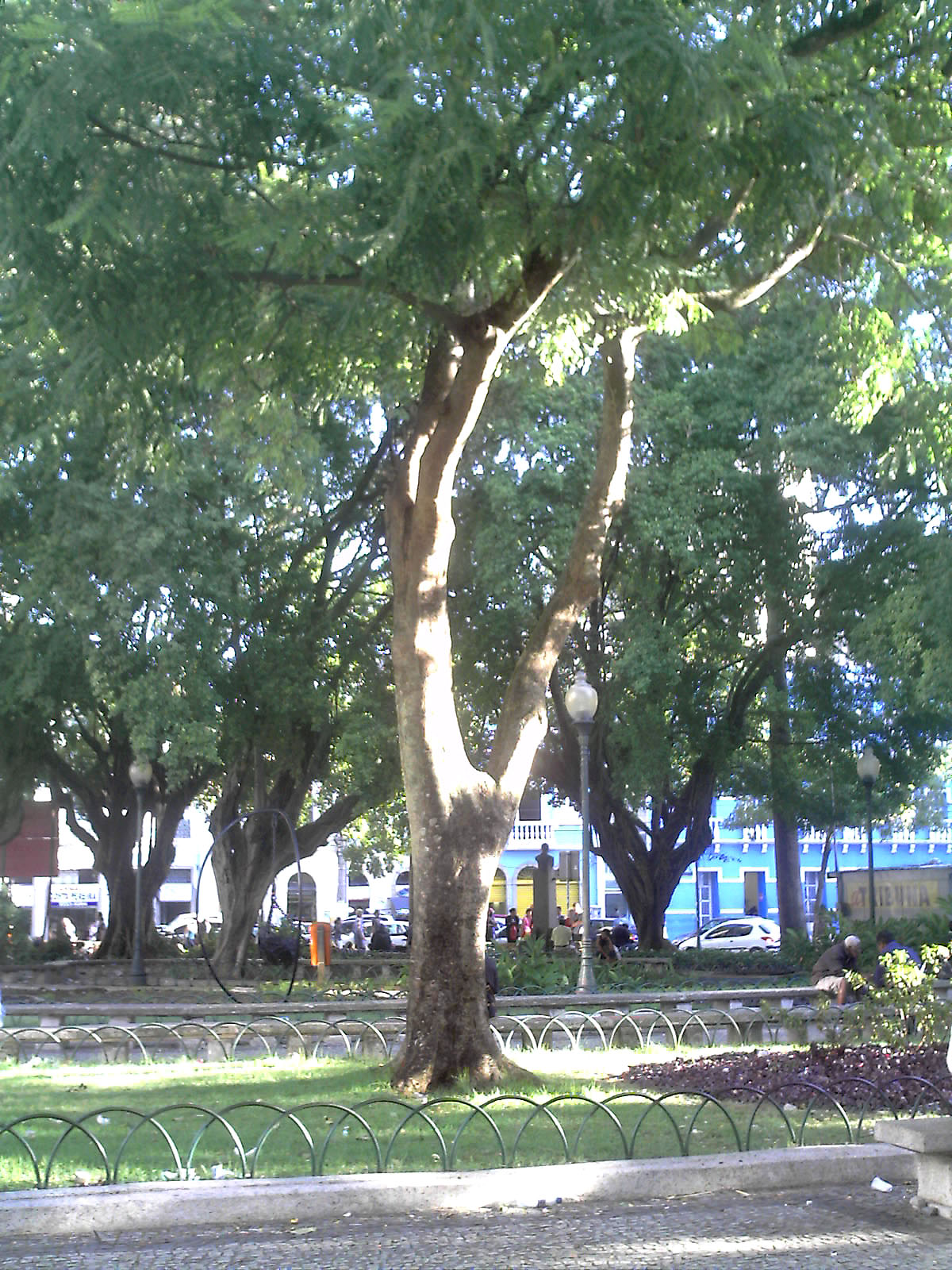
The brazilwood tree, which gives Brazil its name, has dark, valuable wood and provides red dye.

The Tupi speakers' agriculture was key in their cooperation with the Portuguese during the pre-colonial period. During this time, the primary objective of the Portuguese in the region was to harvest and export Brazilwood. To this end, coivara (slash-and-burn) agriculture was employed by indigenous peoples. With the men doing the heavy work of clearing ground and the women planting and harvesting crops, indigenous peoples traded large quantities of Brazilwood with the Portuguese. In return, they were supplied with metal tools which allowed for more efficient ground clearing and quickly abandoned their stone tools.

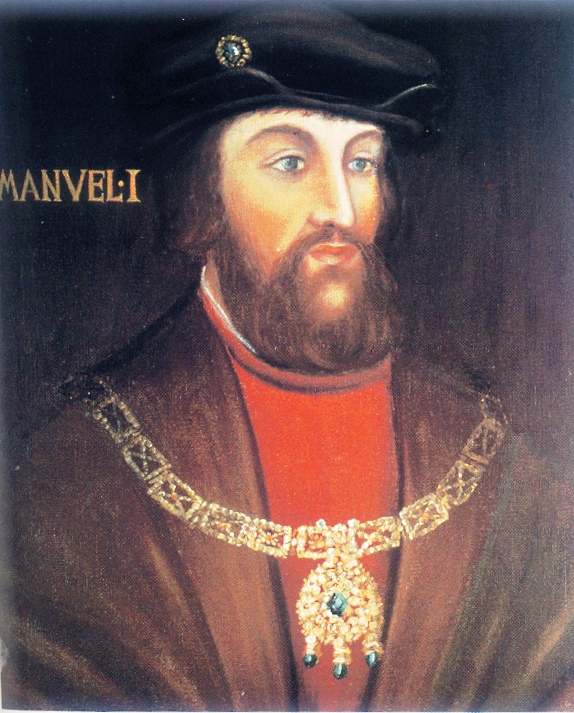
King Manuel I of Portugal

To facilitate the exploitation of Brazilwood, King Manuel I of Portugal granted Fernão de Loronha, after whom the islands of Fernando de Noronha are named, an exclusive license to exploit Brazilwood. Most of the Brazilwood taken from the region was shipped to Northern Europe, where it was valued for the red dye which came from the wood. The dye was especially popular in France, which soon began competing with the Portuguese in an attempt to secure Brazilwood production for themselves. Manuel I viewed these French efforts as violations of his sovereign territory. In 1516, King Manoel charged Cristóvão Jacques with patrolling the coast of Pernambuco against foreign vessels. Jacques established a feitoria, or trading post, on Itamaracá, an island at the mouth of the Canal de Santa Cruz. The trading post was intended to establish relations with the natives, seek information about resources inland, and repel encroachments by other nations.

A French force led by Bertrand d'Ornesan once again tried to establish a trading post in Pernambuco in 1531. The Portuguese responded by sending an armada led by Martim Afonso de Sousa which burned the French outpost and reestablished Portuguese control in the area. Shortly after this victory, Portuguese immigrants began to settle in Brazil. In 1534, King John III of Portugal began granting hereditary captaincies in order to better secure Brazil against foreign powers.

== Colonial Period ==
=== Early Colonial Period (1534–1630) ===
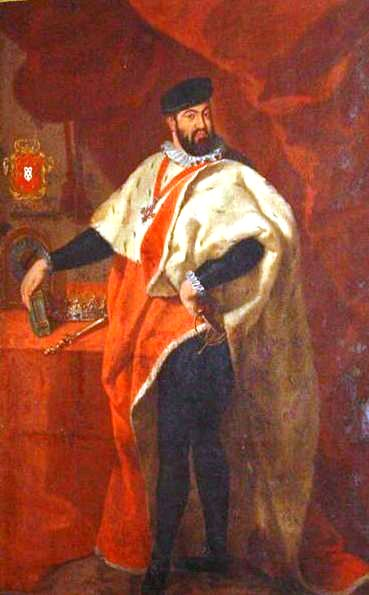
King John III of Portugal

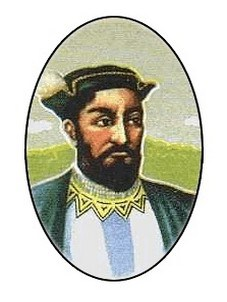
Duarte Coelho, first Lord Proprietor of Pernambuco

By 1534 it became evident to John III of Portugal that in order to retain his rights to Brazil, Portuguese people must settle there. At the time, John viewed controlling trade in Asia as a more pressing matter than cementing control over Brazil, so he instituted the captaincy system which had previously been used in the Azores and other island possessions of Portugal. The Captaincy of Pernambuco was formed and granted to Duarte Coelho, consisting sixty leagues along the Atlantic Coast from the island of Itamaracá in the north to the River Sao Francisco in the south.

Coelho arrived in Brazil in 1535 with his wife Dona Brites de Albuquerque, her brother Jeronimo de Albuquerque, a small group of settlers, and some supplies with which to found his captaincy. While few historical documents exist to the exact nature of Coelho's governance, it is clear that Pernambuco was decidedly the most successful of all the initial captaincies in Brazil. However, Coelho's initial efforts also established Pernambuco's reliance on sugar farming and the latifundia system. As Lord Proprietor, Coelho directed military actions against the French-aligned Caeté people. Upon their defeat in 1537, he established a settlement in a former native village known as Olinda, as well as another village at Igarassu. Duarte Coelho, and later his heirs, enjoyed relative autonomy in developing the captaincy as a major producer of sugar and Portugal's richest Brazilian colony throughout the 16th century. This success persisted until the Dutch invaded and occupied Pernambuco in 1630.

=== Dutch Occupation (1630–1654) ===
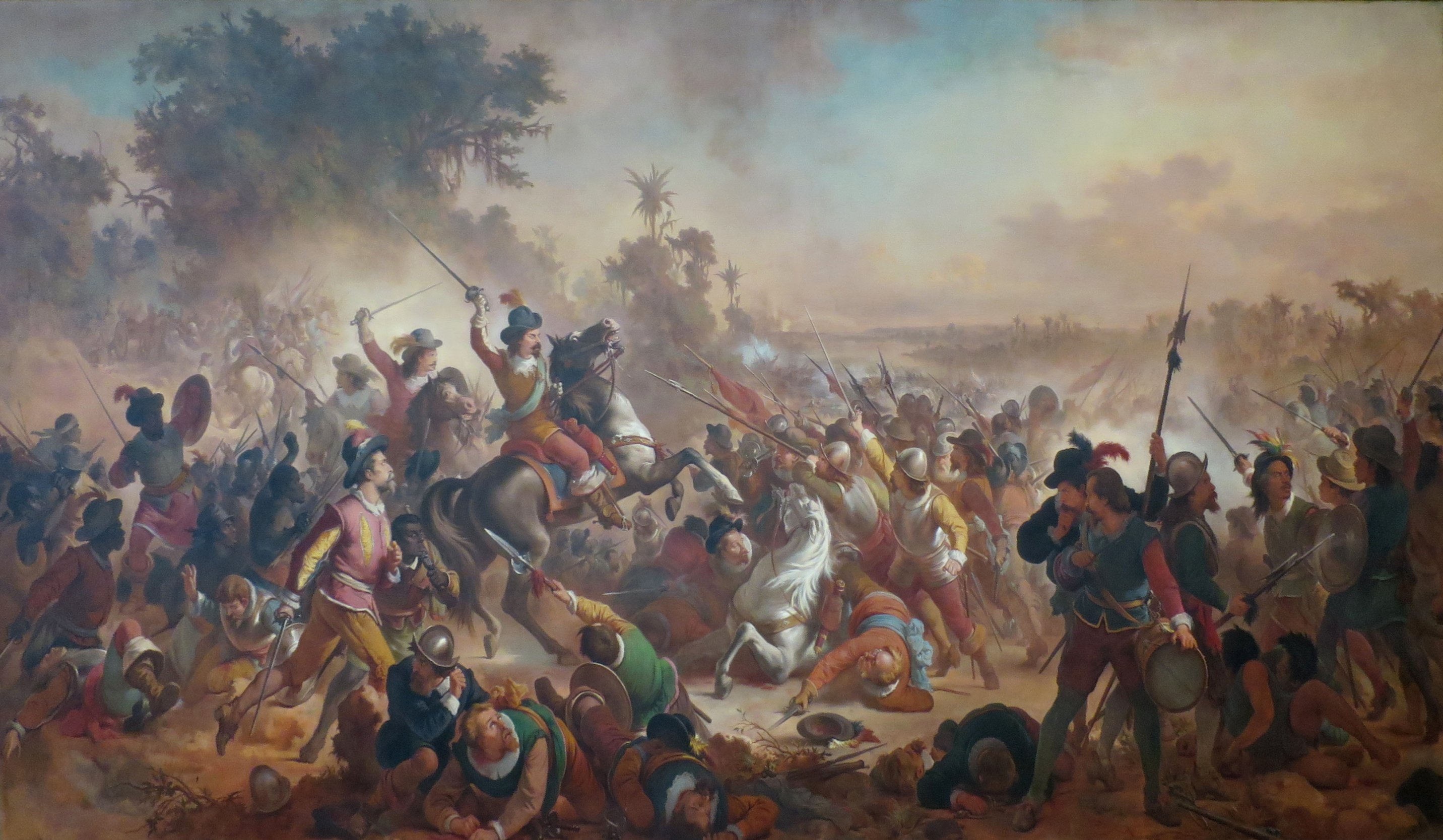
Second Battle of Guararapes, in which the Portuguese forced the Dutch out of Pernambuco

Portugal experienced competition from other foreign powers throughout its colonial history, and preventing these rivals from expanding in the New World was one motivation for its colonization of Brazil. When the kingdom of Portugal fell under the rule of the Spanish Hapsburgs in 1580, however, Brazil became a prime target for the new colonial power of the Netherlands. After the Dutch failed to take Bahia, they invaded and occupied Pernambuco and continued to expand northward to the Amazon River. The Dutch occupation of Pernambuco was resisted by the Portuguese colonists for its duration. This period of Pernambucano history can roughly be divided into three periods: six years of fighting from 1630 to 1636; relative pacification under the governorship of Johan Maurits, from 1636 to 1644; and renewed struggle in the decade after Maurits' recall, from 1644 to 1654, ending with the expulsion of the Dutch.

=== Late Colonial Period (1655–1807) ===
After the Dutch occupation, Pernambuco was never able to restore its place as the most successful captaincy in Brazil. Over the course of the Dutch occupation, Bahia had surpassed Parambuco in sugar production. Additional Dutch colonies in the Caribbean were also developed and began producing sugar, providing fierce new competition for Parambuco within Brazil and internationally. Also contributing to Parambuco's decline in importance was the discovery of gold and diamonds in other Brazilian provinces such as Minas Gerais. Thus, when Brazil became an independent nation, Pernambuco's importance within the new nation was greatly diminished, despite its continued production of sugar.

== Early Brazilian Period (1807–1889) ==
Brazil's independence was predominantly caused by the arrival of the Portuguese royal family in the country. Portugal having been occupied by Napoleon's army and with Rio de Janeiro hosting the royal court, Brazil no longer occupied the role of colony and Portugal was no longer able to function as its metropole. As such, Brazil's ports were opened to foreign trade, its government became America centered, and bureaucratic institutions were established in the new country. Unlike the Spanish colonies in America, Brazil would remain territorially intact, aside from the loss of what is today Uruguay. However, there were rebellions in several regions of Brazil, including in Pernambuco, which could have led to the fracturing of Brazil.

=== Pernambuco Revolts ===
See also Rebellions and revolutions in Brazil

Flag of the 1817 Pernambucan revolt

Two meaningful themes explaining events in Pernambuco leading up to, directly relating to, or following on the independence of Brazil were, first, regional rivalry with other parts of Brazil, and, second, conflict within Pernambuco between the mozombos (those born in Brazil) and the reinóis (those born in Portugal). These two factors had led to the 18th century Mascate War, which can be viewed as an early indicator of the strife which would continue to occur between native born Brazilians and the Portuguese reinóis. Several early rebellions among the intellectual class of Brazil achieved little and had minimal impact on Brazilian history, including the 1801 Inconfidencia of Pernambuco. After 1808 these separatist rebellions were primarily associated with Brazil's elevation to a kingdom, as many in Pernambuco preferred a republic to a monarchy. In 1817, the region rebelled for this reason, but the rebellion was quickly put down by naval and land forces of the monarch and its leaders were executed.

King John eventually returned to Portugal, leaving his son Pedro I as the Brazilian regent. Refusing to become a colony of Portugal again, Prince Pedro established the Empire of Brazil and promulgated a new constitution. Pernambuco again rebelled in 1824 in response to this new constitution, forming the short-lived Confederation of the Equator along with Ceará and Paraíba. The confederation was quickly crushed by imperial forces and its leaders were executed. Additionally, by imperial decree, the size of Pernambuco was substantially reduced, with the comarca of São Francisco being lost. In 1829, Pernambuco again rebelled and was quickly subdued.

From 1832 to 1836, Pernambuco fought yet another rebellion against Brazil in the War of the Cabanos. However, this uprising was different in the sense that it was primarily a popular revolt, as opposed to earlier rebellions which were largely affairs of the elite. In addition, the rebellion was largely agrarian, whereas other rebellions in Pernambuco were mostly confined to Recife and Olinda. The rebellion's leader, Vincente Ferreira de Paulo, is considered to be a populist caudilho, or military dictator.

The Praieira revolt was the last unsuccessful revolt in the Empire of Brazil and occurred in Pernambuco from 1847 to 1848. This revolt, again due to resentment of the Portuguese and factionalism, was put down by imperial forces, though with somewhat fewer reprisals than in earlier revolts.

=== Geography ===
The territorial extent of Pernambuco was fluid during the colonial period, and the current borders were roughly set in the 19th century after Ceará and São Francisco were removed from the state. For most of its history, records and accounts are only available for the coastal forest zone of the coast. The other two areas of the state, the agreste and sertão, where literacy was very low had minimal historical records even in the 19th century.

=== Social history ===
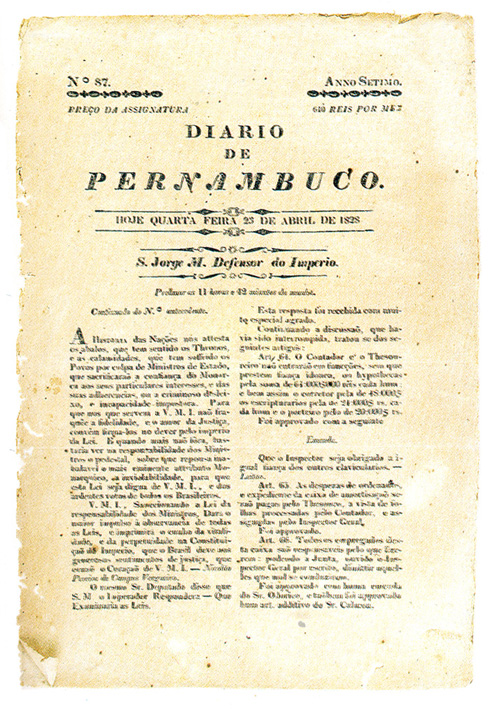
1828 issue of the Diário de Pernambuco

Pernambuco was home to several prominent, rigid classes from colonial times into the 20th century. The elites of the state consisted of government officials appointed by an external ruler, the senhores de engenho (sugar mill owners), and colonels (local landowners, especially inland). The most influential elites were the sugar mill owners. In the middle class were the lavradores da cana (small sugar cane growers), merchants, and certain skilled workers. The largest classes consisted of slaves, freedmen, sharecroppers, and common laborers.

During the colonial era, printing presses were outlawed in Brazil and education was extremely limited, with only around 3,000 colonists receiving degrees in Coimbra and a low literacy rate of 15% even among the free population. Despite this, a printing press was established in Pernambuco by 1817, later becoming the Diário de Pernambuco which claims to be the "oldest continuously circulating daily in Latin America." Under the Empire of Brazil, Recife became the home of the second law school in Brazil.

==== Abolition of Slavery ====
The Transatlantic slave trade was effectively eliminated in 1850, further exacerbating the shortage of slaves in Pernambuco. In 1871, Brazil enacted the law of free birth which thenceforth made free all children born to slaves. In 1888, under the influence of an increasingly urban society and with the advocacy of intellectuals, such as Pernambucan politician Joaquim Nabuco, slavery was abolished.

The abolition of slavery had only minimal impact on the social structure of Pernambuco. The elites within the state maintained their privileges, and freed slaves mainly became wage workers in an economy where labor was cheap. The elites of Pernambuco were not as averse to modernization, so long as that modernization did not interfere with their traditional privileges. As such, resistance to abolition was tempered by the relative cooperation of the elites, as well as by other economic conditions. These included the suppression of the Atlantic slave trade which had already diminished the number of slaves in Pernambuco, as well as the consolidation of sugar mills which made the industry less reliant on slave labor. As such, while abolition was not hampered in the region, the condition of freedmen in Pernambuco was not greatly improved, as they mostly melded into an existing labor supply of impoverished workers.

=== Economic history ===
From the time of Portuguese settlement, the economy of Pernambuco had been based on latifundia (large estates), monoculture (one-crop), and slavery. Now that Pernambuco was no longer a colony which had to produce for the Portuguese metropole, changes in the economy occurred and new institutions appeared. Some of these had been long available only in Portugal and some were a function of factors such as the Industrial Revolution. However, overall, during the Empire, the economy of Pernambuco was dominated by the decline of sugar production.

While sugar was Brazil's primary export in the early years of the Empire, coffee took its place in the second decade of the Empire. This coffee was mainly grown in the central and southern regions of Brazil and not in Pernambuco, and the state became increasingly unable to compete with these new agricultural producers. By the 1850s there was limited industrialization in Pernambuco with nine textile mills, a candle factory, and a tobacco factory among other factories. However, Pernambuco remained largely reliant on sugar production, and modernization of the sugar industry in the second half of the 19th century in response to the end of the slave trade was only minimally successful.

Cotton is indigenous to Brazil and has been cultivated in Pernambuco since prehistory. Beginning in the late eighteenth century, as a result of the Industrial Revolution, cotton became an important export for Pernambuco through the beginning of the Empire. The American War of 1812 provided an impetus for cotton cultivation. The war provided a much-expanded market for this export crop. After 1830, United States production largely replaced Brazilian cotton. However, in the decade of the 1860s, during the American Civil War, cotton again became an important export for Pernambuco. Cotton, in contrast with sugar, was grown in the agreste.

In 1851, the first bank in Pernambuco, the Commercial Bank of Pernambuco, was established. This bank and others would become the principal lenders and creditors in Pernambuco, displacing merchants and religious establishments. In 1858, the first railroad in Pernambuco began operation between Recife and Cabo. The railways would primarily speed exports to the external markets. The effects of the railroads in unifying Brazil and improving internal transportation were less significant.

== First Brazilian Republic (1889–1930) ==
From	To	Governors of Pernambuco
1889		José Simeão de Oliveira
1890		José Vincente Meira de Vasconcelos
1890		Henrique Pereira Lucena
1892		Alexandre José Barbosa Lima
1896		Joaquim Correia de Araujo
1900		Antônio Gonçalves Ferreira
1904		Sigismundo Gonçalves
1908		Herculino Bandeira
1911		Emídio Dantas Barreto
1915		Manoel Borba
1919		José Rufino Bezerra Cavalcanti
1922		Sérgio Loreto
1926		Estácio Coimbra

The demise of the Empire and the institution of the Republic were events which took place far from Pernambuco. The republicans of Pernambuco were not well organized nor influential. The monarchists quickly became republicans and Pernambuco was little changed. The federal system established by the First Brazilian Republic forced states to compete for central government patronage allowing the states in the Southern regions to benefit and reducing benefits to Pernambuco and other states in Brazil's Northeastern region. Aid to the periodically drought-stricken Northeast provides a window into understanding the negative effects of regionalism on Pernambuco throughout much of the states history. Under the Empire, the government had been little inclined to provide drought aid. Generally, under the federal system of the First Republic this pattern continued. The presidencies of Epitácio Pessôa and Artur Bernardes provide an illustration of this. Pessôa, in this period, the only president from the Northeast, the federal government spent up to 15% of the national budget on drought oriented public works in the Northeast. When Bernardes succeeded him funding was promptly stopped, throwing thousands out of work. Not coincidentally banditry in the Northeast increased and the career of the infamous cangaceiro Lampião began. The elites of Pernambuco were quite successful in maintaining their privileges and control of Pernambuco's government. Moreover, while the government was aware of Pernambuco's problems, these problems remained unresolved or worsened, and efforts to address them encountered resistance including violence. Life for the poor was harsh, with high fertility and mortality, malnutrition, and violence.

== The Era of Getulio Vargas ==
Getúlio Vargas became the provisional president of Brazil in 1930 and was elected constitutional president in 1937. In contrast to the federal structure of the First Republic, the Vargas Era was embodied by a strong central government. As such, the state of Pernambuco, while still a leading state in the Northeast, exerted minimal influence within Brazil.

In 1930, the Democratic Party of Pernambuco was able to seize the opportunity presented by the rise of Vargas on the national level to install Lima Cavalcanti as interventor in control of the government of Pernambuco. Cavalcanti would remain in power in Pernambuco until removed by Vargas in 1937. The government of Pernambuco was riven by competition between factions of the elites struggling for control and spoils.

=== Social and economic conditions ===
During the early years of Cavalcanti's rule in Pernambuco, one of the periodic droughts that occur in northeastern Brazil had a massive impact on Pernambuco's social and economic well-being. The drought was unusually severe and municipal warehouses in the interior suffered looting and streams of migrants came from the sertão to the coast. Initially, Pernambuco was excluded from federal aid to the Northeast. At the end of Cavalcanti's rule in 1937, the continued primacy of the declining sugar economy left Pernambuco dominated by the local aristocracy with little or no improvement for the lower classes. During the Vargas era, an important development in Brazil was the emergence of a middle class. Unfortunately, even in the 1950s, this middle class was practically nonexistent in the inland regions of Pernambuco and very hard to find in cities like Recife. For the poor of Pernambuco and the Northeast region, the path to a better life was exemplified by the migration of the family of Luiz Inácio Lula da Silva— who would later become President of Brazil— from Pernambuco to São Paulo. The trip, over unpaved roads in the back of a truck, took 13 days.

=== Between Vargas (1954) and Military Dictatorship (1964) ===
In the decade after the Vargas era, only President Juscelino Kubitschek served a complete term in office. All national politics remained dominated by the pro-Vargas and anti-Vargas factions. Pernambuco (along with Bahia) in the middle of the twentieth century was one of the two leading states in the Brazilian Northeast. In that period, income averaged $140 per year, per capita, consumption of electricity was about one fifth the Brazilian national average, infant mortality rates ran from 250 to 500 per 1000 live births, about three quarters of the adult population was illiterate, and fewer that 3 percent of students finished primary school. Moreover, while the sugar industry in Pernambuco was recovering from the lows of the early twentieth century, the standard of living for the poorest sugar workers was declining.

In this environment the workers began to organize and the Ligas Camponesas (peasant leagues) emerged. An attorney and member of the Brazilian Socialist Party (PSB), Francisco Julião, championed the peasants' cause and the publicity surrounding the ensuing court and political struggle caused the peasant league to grow to an estimated 40,000 members in Pernambuco.

Following so closely after the Cuban revolution, the peasant leagues gave rise to an American CIA effort to clandestinely support moderate peasant organizations. One of the most noteworthy of these moderate organizations was the Pernambuco Rural Orientation Service (SORPE) organized by two priests, Paulo Crespo and Antonio de Melo. An outgrowth of SORPE's effort were several unions. In 1963, 200,000 sugar workers in Pernambuco went on strike and won an 80% wage increase.

Beginning during the Kubitschek presidency another important agent for the development of Pernambuco was the Superentendência do Desenvolvimento do Nordeste (SUDENE). Under its director, noted economist Celso Furtado, SUDENE set forth a three-year plan for economic development. Although the military coup of 1964 would interrupt this plan, SUDENE, and the peasant leagues, were significant elements in developing a political voice for the poor of Pernambuco.

== Brazilian Military Government (1964–1985) ==
In 1964, a coup established the military as the government of Brazil. Unlike previous occasions when the military intervened and forced a change in government and then withdrew, this time a military dictatorship was established which would last until 1985. While treatment of this period at the national level is beyond the scope of this article, the military government frequently resorted to violence in the state of Pernambuco. Under the military dictatorship, almost all of the change-oriented movements and organizations established during the Second Republic were halted or dismantled in the name of the regime's fiscal stabilization policy.

Despite the dismantling of many of these institutions, there were certain impacts made by these change-oriented movements that were not undone. Specifically, these movements provided a basis for both infrastructural development in Pernambuco and education of the state's population. For example, a Peace Corps worker recalled attending a meeting in rural Pernambuco in 1967. Of the thirty-five union officers attending thirteen had acquired literacy thru the Popular Culture Movement prior to the military dictatorship. In addition, some entities which were considered to be more moderate were allowed to continue in a limited fashion. One of these entities was the Rural Orientation Service of Pernambuco (SORPE), which identified leaders among the peasantry and established cooperatives in rural areas that assisted peasants in marketing their produce. These cooperatives directly addressed one hurdle in the development of Pernambuco, which was the practice of only growing sugar can on traditional plantations and having to import food form other Brazilian states. This caused a lack of production of local food crops and was a barrier to the development of the state.

=== Opposition to the Dictatorship ===
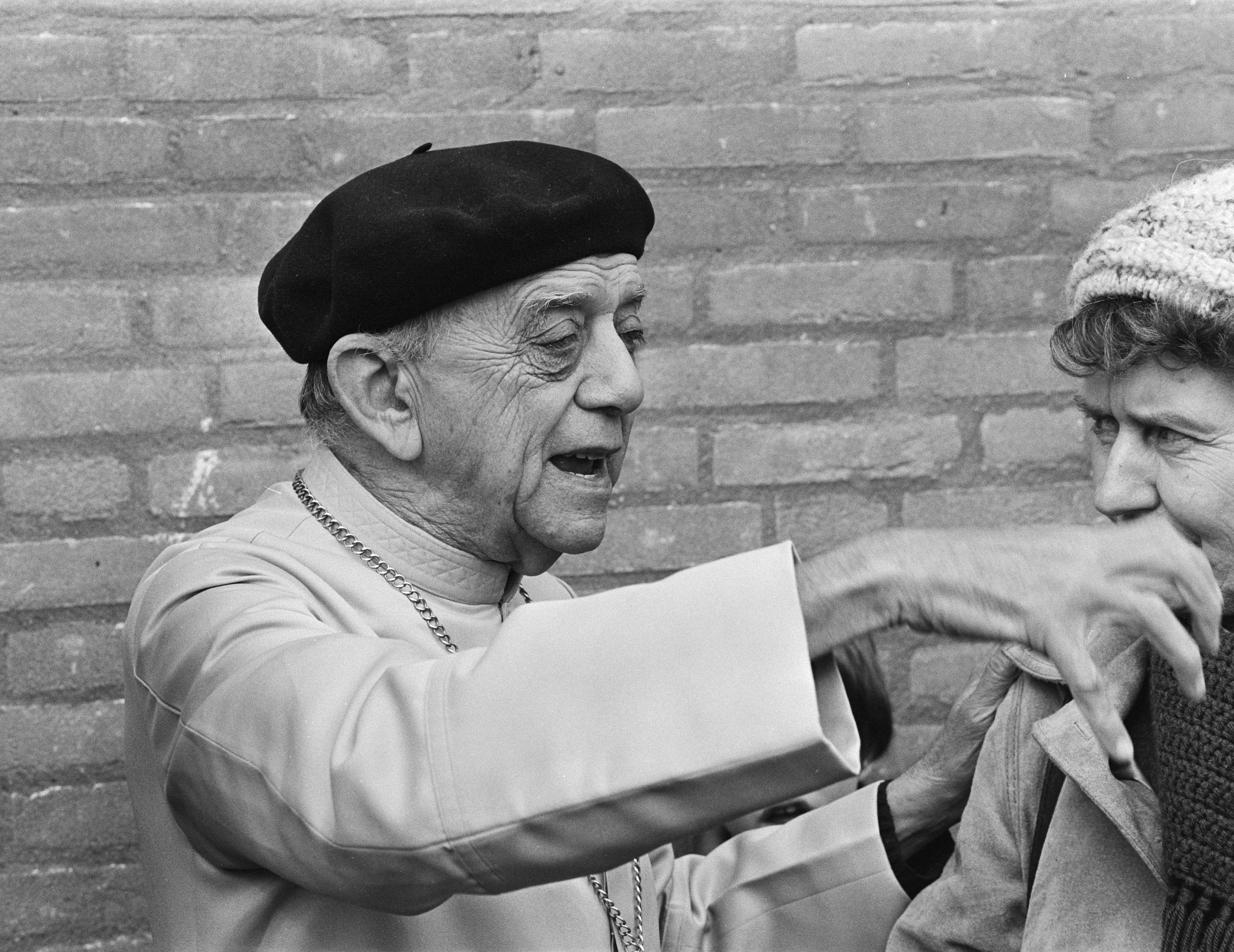
Hélder Câmara in 1984

Despite brutal suppression on the part of military dictators, opposition to the regime quickly arose, especially in the Northeastern region of Brazil.

The church in Pernambuco was not the only center of resistance in the state, nor was Archbishop Hélder Câmara the only bishop in Brazil to oppose the military dictatorship. However, throughout the military dictatorship the Catholic Church was the face of the resistance. Pernambuco's Archbishop Câmara, a leading exponent of Liberation Theology, became one of Brazil's most well known advocates for the poor and opponent of the military dictators. Under the archbishop's leadership several priests advocated for the impoverished of Pernambuco and at least one priest in Recife was tortured and murdered without government investigation in 1969. Nevertheless, resistance continued. Toward the end of the military dictatorship, along with unions and squatters, the Catholic Church in Brazil participated in organizing the Movimento dos Trabalhadores Rurais Sem Terra (MST).

=== End of Military Dictatorship ===
Two presidents—one a newly elected military dictator, the other a future Twenty-first Century president—took noteworthy actions toward the end of the military dictatorship. Future president Luiz Inácio Lula da Silva, a native of Pernambuco, led a series of strikes in São Paulo. The other newly elected president and dictator, João Figueiredo, declared an abertura (opening) to democracy. This declaration was followed by an amnesty, elections for governors and legislative elections in 1982, and in 1985 a civilian president of Brazil was elected.

== Modern History (1985– ) ==
From	To	Governor of Pernambuco
1983	1986	Roberto Magalhães
1986	1987	Gustavo Krause Gonçalves Sobrinho
1987	1990	Miguel Arraes de Alencar
1990	1991	Carlos Wilson Rocha de Queirós Campos
1991	1995	Joaquim Francisco de Freitas Cavalcanti
1995	1999	Miguel Arraes de Alencar
1999	2006	Jarbas de Andrade Vasconcelos
2006	2007	Jose Mendonça Bezerra Filho
2007	2014	Eduardo Henrique Accioly Campos
2014	2015	João Soares Lyra Neto
2015		Paulo Henrique Saraiva Câmara

=== Rural life ===
During military rule one earlier effort to improve the lot of the rural poor, the Ligas Camponesas (peasant leagues) was suppressed. After the military dictatorship, the Movimento dos Trabalhadores Sem Terra (MST), which had been organized in 1984 in the far South of Brazil, had some success in providing land to the rural poor. MST intentionally sought to organize on a national basis, not a regional basis. MST began organizing in the South using land occupations and provisions of the Brazilian constitutions. MST experienced considerable success. However, when MST began organizing in Pernambuco, the process was more difficult due to Pernambuco's historic culture. MST found that the landless poor in Pernambuco's zona da mata (coastal areas of sugar cultivation) were amenable to organization during the 1990s largely because during the last decades of the century the market for sugar was in severe decline. Accustomed to regular paychecks, at least when employed, sugar cane workers saw subsistence farming as disadvantageous. Regular paychecks mean immediate money for food, whereas subsistence farming produced food only after planting, cultivation, and harvest. However, the due to the shrinking of the market for sugar that began in the 1980s and continued through the 1990s, MST was successful in organizing in Pernambuco and would execute land occupations especially during the 1990s. While many peasants returned to sugar farming at the turn of the millennium with the revival of the market for sugar, MST was still able to improve the rural quality of life in Pernambuco.

=== Urban life ===
While attempts to address land ownership in Pernambuco experienced limited success affecting land tenure in the last half of the Twentieth Century through organizations such as the ‘Movimento dos Trabalhadores Rurais Sem Terra’ (MST) and the ‘Ligas Camponesas’ in the city of Recife a fifty-year effort to resolve squatter's rights in the city center came to fruition in the 2014 granting of titled ownership of homes in Ponte Maduro to residents of this favela (slum). This event was celebrated in a ceremony under the aegis of Governor Eduardo Campos, the mayor of Recife, and other officials. As a substantial majority of these new landowners were women, this achievement has been hailed not simply as addressing land tenure, but as a significant step in addressing gender equality.

== See also ==
- Captaincy of Pernambuco 1534 to 1808
- War of the Peddlers 1710 to 1711
- Conspiracy of Suassuna 1801
- Confederation of the Equator 1824
- Praieira Revolution 1848 to 1850
- Timeline of Recife
