= Captaincy of Pernambuco =

1534–1821 captaincy in northeastern colonial Brazil

The Captaincy of Pernambuco or New Lusitania (Portuguese: Nova Lusitânia) was one of the hereditarily granted administrative subdivisions of northeastern Portuguese Brazil during the colonial period from 1534 to 1821, with a brief interruption from 1630 to 1654 when it was part of Dutch Brazil. At the time of the Independence of Brazil, it became a province of United Kingdom of Portugal, Brazil and the Algarves. Captaincies were originally horizontal tracts of land (generally) 50 leagues (Note: A league was ~5.6km) wide extending from the Atlantic Ocean to the Tordesillas meridian.

During the earliest years of colonial Brazil, the Captaincy of Pernambuco was one of only two prosperous captaincies in Brazil (the other being Captaincy of São Vicente), primarily due to growing sugar cane. As a result of the failure of other captaincies, in part due to the invasion of the Northeast coast of Brazil by the Dutch during the Seventeenth Century, Pernambuco's geographical area grew as failed captaincies were attached. At its height, the Captaincy of Pernambuco included the territories of the modern states of Pernambuco, Paraíba, Alagoas,Ceará, Rio Grande do Norte and the western portion of Bahia (north and west of the São Francisco River) having thus a southern border with Minas Gerais. In the years surrounding Brazilian independence, the captaincy was reduced by repartitioning of several previously merged territories, until today's state with the same name was left.

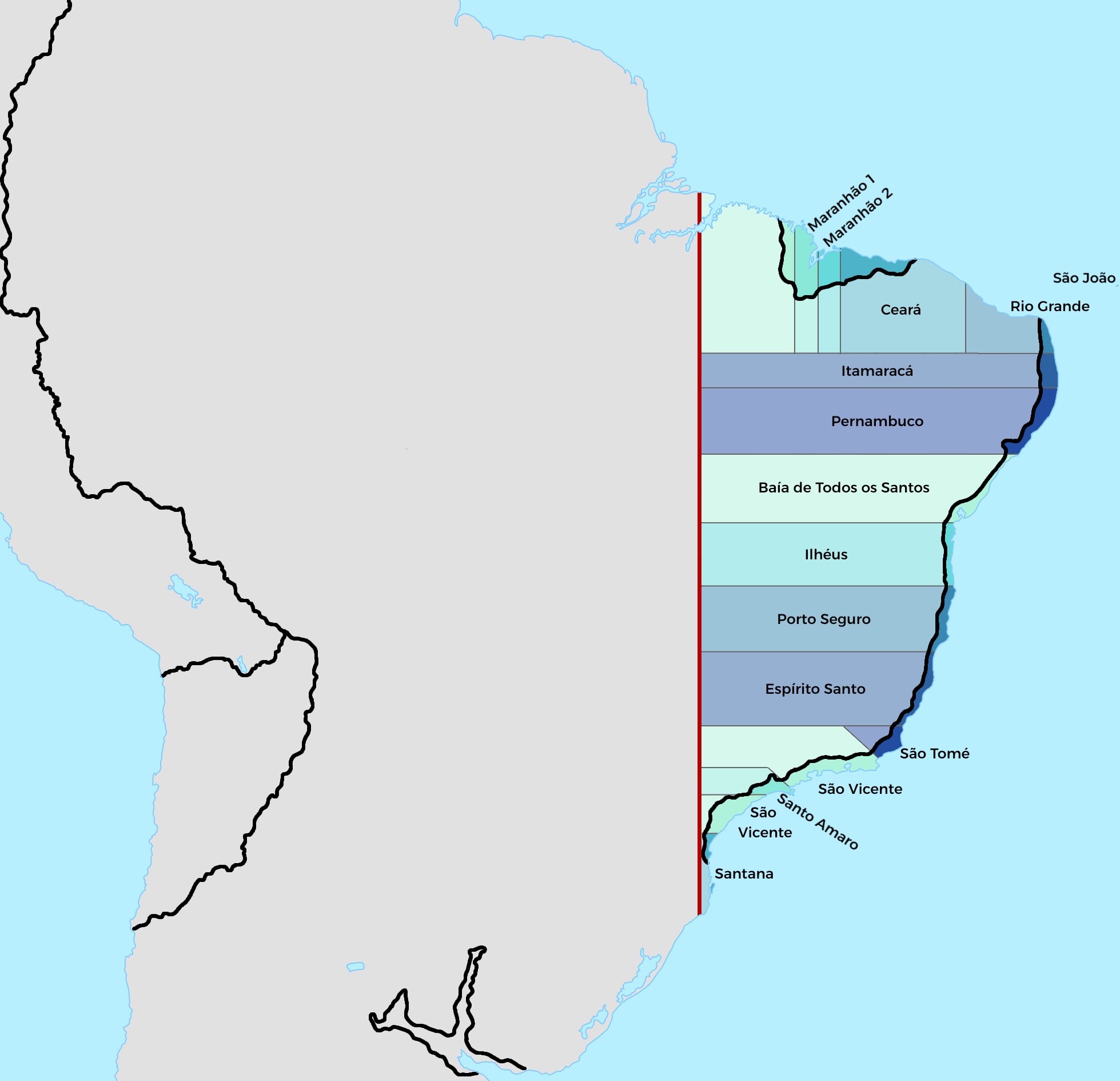
Captaincies of Brazil in 1534

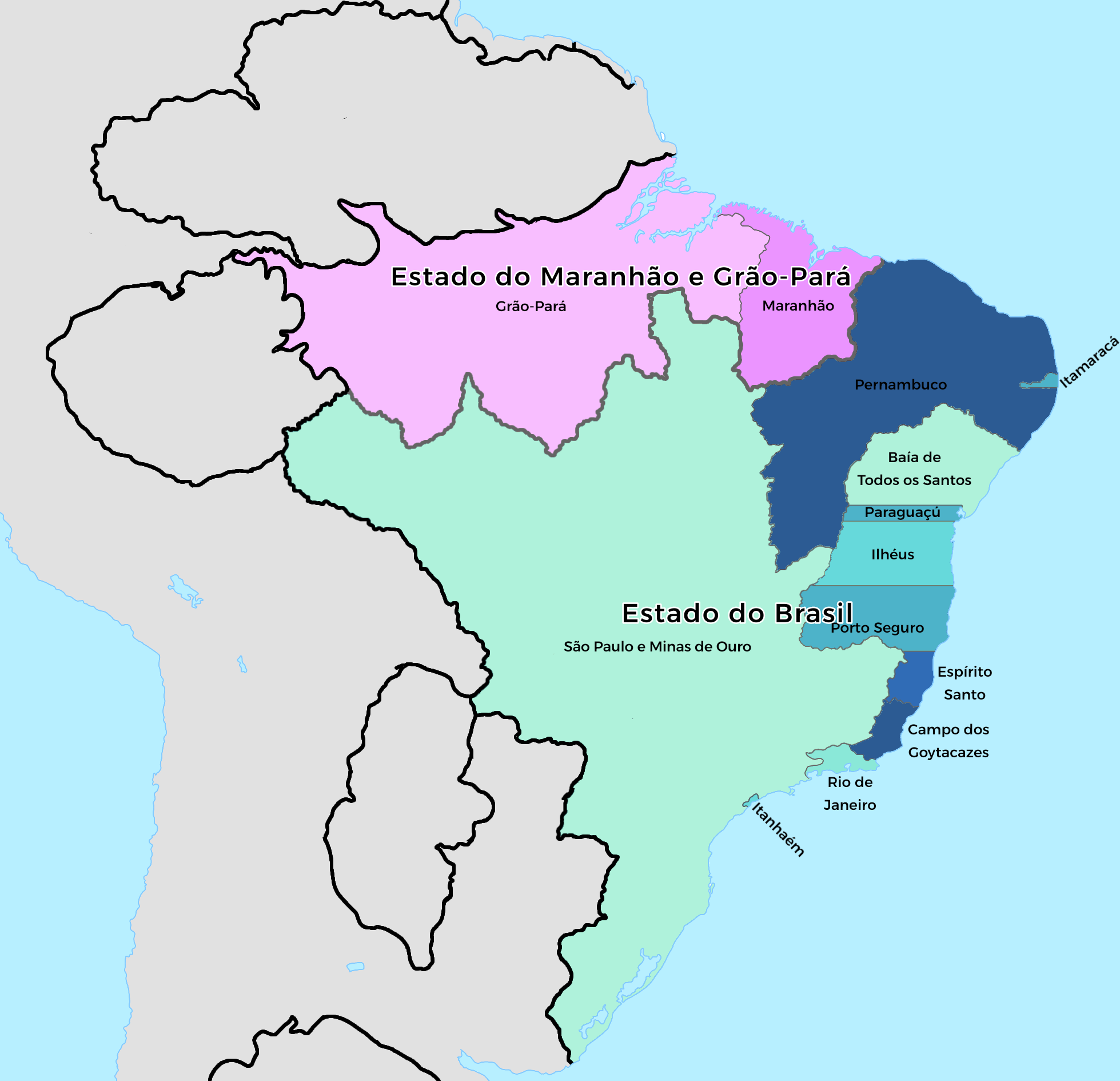
Colonial Pernambuco at its zenith in 1709

== History ==
Portuguese coat of arms of Pernambuco

=== Etymology ===
Recent research indicates that the name Pernambuco derives from "Boca de Fernão" (Fernão's Mouth). The place, now known as Canal de Santa Cruz, is where Fernão de Noronha loaded his ships with Brazilian wood to trade in Europe. The name was spoken by the Tupi as "Pernãobuka", and was recorded by French writers as "Fernambouc"; the two pronunciations have been combined into the name most common today.

== Colonial period: the Captaincy of Pernambuco ==
In 1630, at the close of this initial period of Portuguese colonization of Pernambuco, then the richest and most successful colony in Brazil, the Dutch attacked with sixty-seven ships, 7000 men, and 1,170 guns. The size of the force they mounted is a witness to the wealth and success of the Captaincy of Pernambuco after just 95 years of colonization.

=== The foundation of the Captaincy of Pernambuco ===
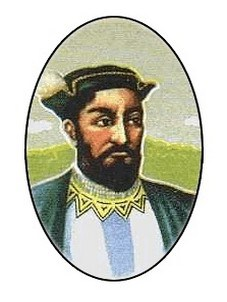
Duarte Coelho, Donatario

While no single person was solely responsible for the success of Pernambuco during this period, much of the credit belongs to Duarte Coelho Pereira, the first donatário (Lord Proprietor). Duarte Coelho arrived in Nova Lusitânia (or "New Lusitania") in 1535 along with his wife Dona Brites de Albuquerque, her brother Jeronimo de Albuquerque, and a small armada of settlers and supplies to found his captaincy. Despite historians having few remaining documents relating to Duarte Coelho's governance of what was decidedly the most successful of all the initial captaincies of Brasil, it is clear that the first donatário's initial efforts set Pernambuco on the path to success. Duarte Coehlo directed military actions against the French-allied Caeté Indians and upon their defeat in 1537 established a settlement at the site of a former Marin Indian village, henceforth known as Olinda, as well as another village at Igarassu.

During the early 1540s, Duarte Coelho made a visit to Portugal and found backers to invest in engenhos (sugar mills). Duarte wrote the King that fields of cane were planted and one large engenho was nearing completion. In 1576 Pero de Magalhães Gandavo reported that Pernambuco had about 1000 (Portuguese) inhabitants and twenty-three engenhos (three or four not yet completed). In a good year Pernambuco produced more than 50,000 arrobas or 800 tons (1 arroba = 32 lbs ~ 14.75 kg) of sugar. There are varying report of the number of engenhos in Pernambuco during the decade of the 1580s: In 1584 Frei Fernão Cardim reported 66; also in 1584 Pe. José de Anchieta reported 60; In 1587 Gabriel Soares, reported 50; and also about 1587 Lopes Vaz reported 70. In 1612, Pernambuco produced 14,000 tons of sugar.

As a result of his leadership, sugar would, by 1570, rival Brazilwood as Pernambuco's most profitable export. He also encouraged the cultivation of cotton. Due to the cultivation of sugar and cotton, Pernambuco was the most successful captaincy in Brazil. Among other problems the first donatário encountered was frontier lawlessness, in part due to the crown policy of sending degredados overseas rather than imprisoning them. While many degredados were convicted and exiled for very minor offenses, there were enough murderers, bandits, thieves, and swindlers that Duarte Coelho called the degredados poison and complained to the King that he could not be expected to straighten out these convicts.

While in twenty years, the Captaincy of Pernambuco was flourishing, most of the other captaincies of Brazil were not. (The other successful settlement was São Paulo which was first known as São Vicente).

The King decided that a Governor for all of Brazil was necessary. In 1549, Tomé de Sousa was dispatched to the failed captaincy in Bahia de Todos os Santos.

In acknowledgment of the success of Duarte Coelho, the new governor was instructed to visit all the remaining captaincies except for Pernambuco. The Jesuits and other officials of the new government of Brazil were not similarly restricted. In 1551, the visit of Jesuits Manuel da Nóbrega and Antonio Pires resulted in multiple letters back to both the crown and their Jesuit headquarters in Coimbra. The fathers described a settlement in which laws both civil and particularly religious were broken probably as much as they were observed. Father Nobrega complained variously of sins that were long-established and deep-rooted.

He reported extensive sexual license taken with the indigenous women, who freely gave themselves to the Portuguese men. He also noted many mestiço children in the colony who were raised without instruction in the faith or education. Nóbrega commented as well on the clergy in Pernambuco, saying they were living no better lives than the laymen. While in Pernambuco the Jesuits preached the gospel in the indigenous communities and made efforts to reestablish Christian mores among the Portuguese as well. They also established two brotherhoods of the rosary one for the Portuguese and one for the slaves. However, their stay was short, Father Nóbrega returned to Bahia quickly and after the departure of Father Pires in 1554 the Jesuits did not return to Pernambuco until 1561.

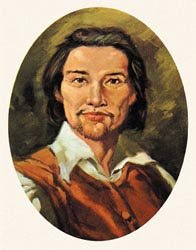
Jerônimo de Albuquerque

In 1553, Duarte Coelho returned to Portugal, leaving the governance of Pernambuco with Dona Brites de Albuquerque and her brother Jeronimo de Albuquerque. When he died while in Portugal, his heir Duarte Coelho de Albuquerque was a minor and Dona Brites would govern during her son's minority and while he was in Portugal to finish his education. While Duarte Coelho had led fighting against the French and their Caeté allies during his lifetime, his absence was soon followed by more fighting with the Caeté people. Jeronimo de Albuquerque, who married the daughter of a Tabajara chieftain and fathered at least 24 children, was an effective leader in both peace and war. Shortly after the departure of the first donatário for Portugal, there was renewed war. By 1555, Jeronimo de Albuquerque had driven the Caetés South and opened up the várzea (flood plain) around the Capibaribe river for settlement and sugar cultivation. This would prove to be one of the most productive areas for sugar cultivation. After the return of the heir in 1560, there was again fighting with the indigenous tribes in which the second donatário, Duarte Coelho de Albuquerque, and his brother, Jorge de Albuquerque Coelho, participated.

During most of his lifetime, Duarte Coelho had enjoyed a free hand in developing his captaincy. In the period following his death until the beginning of the Seventeenth Century, Pernambuco continued to develop along a path set by the first donatário with success breeding success and with somewhat less guidance from Duarte Coelho's heirs and little interference in the captaincy by the governors-general in Bahia. The reasons were several: First, despite the intention of the crown to reduce the privileges previously granted to the donataries and enhance the royal government in Bahia, the crown's intentions were often not realized in Pernambuco. The Portuguese crown first experienced the death of João III in 1557. At that time, his grandson and heir, Sebastian, was three years old. In 1578, Sebastian led an ill-advised invasion of Morocco. He was defeated at the Battle of Alcácer Quibir. His uncle, Cardinal Enrique reigned for two years and died without an heir. (In 1580, Philip II of Spain assumed the crown as Philip I of Portugal.)

Second, while Dona Brites and her brother Jerónimo de Albuquerque continued to guide the captaincy during their lifetimes, the sons and heirs of Duarte Coelho were most often absent, first for education in Portugal, later for service to the crown including their participation at the battle of Alcácer Quibir where both were captured, subsequently ransomed, and after which the second donatário, Duarte Coelho de Albuquerque, died. His brother Jorge de Albuquerque Coelho, the third donatário never returned to Pernambuco and died in 1602.

Third, in Brazil, the royal governors, despite now having instructions to visit Pernambuco, never visited before the beginning of the Seventeen Century. Mem de Sá was occupied with the French incursion in Rio de Janeiro, and most of the other royal governors were occupied with wars with indigenous peoples and the search for gold, silver, and emeralds. The lack of visitation by the governors-general is worthy of note. As was common with the Iberian monarchs, the royal treasury was insufficient to provide satisfactory compensation for royal officials and it was expected for all officials to supplement their salaries with fees and by finding business opportunities during their tenure. In the absence of the Governor and his entourage, Pernambuco's colonists would have had fewer high-ranking officials competing for available opportunities.

=== Jesuits and other religious orders in Pernambuco ===
In 1561, the Jesuits returned to Pernambuco. Jesuit history in Brazil is much better known than that of many other religious orders. However, despite the many complaints by the Jesuits about the settlers, both lay, and clergy, there were several religious establishments in Pernambuco before and even during the Dutch period. Local third orders and similar organizations, such as funerary groups, were founded in this pre-Dutch period. Moreover, that most well-known Portuguese charitable organization Misericordia was established in Olinda early in the Sixteenth Century. Further, long before the Dutch came, the Franciscans established friaries in Olinda and four other communities, the Carmelites also had a friary in Olinda, and the Benedictines an Olinda monastery as well as a plantation in the countryside, and all these were in addition to the secular clergy in the churches.

The religious orders, especially the Jesuits, gathered indigenous peoples into 'Aldeias' (villages) to civilize and Christianize them. The Jesuits, in particular, became advocates and protectors of the Indians. It is likely, because the Jesuits were absent from Pernambuco from 1554 until 1561, that the effective genocide of indigenous tribes in Pernambuco was more due to military campaigns, such as those led by the donatary family, than to the gathering and acculturating efforts of the religious orders, such as those in Bahia that suffered epidemics that killed tens of thousands of indigenous people gathered in aldeias in 1552 through 1561, Moreover, the depopulation of indigenous peoples from Pernambuco was also advanced by migrations such as the when 60,000 Tupinambá from Pernambuco departed into the interior and thence to Maranhão (where in the next century their descendants would again suffer Portuguese colonization.) By 1584, there were reports of areas of 30 miles without a single tribal village, and Pernambuco, once heavily populated by indigenous peoples and dependent on their labor, suffered a labor shortage.

=== Sugar and slavery ===
Year	Engenhos	African Slaves	Production
1550	5		
1576	23	1000	50,000 Arrobas
1584	60		200,000 Arrobas
1585	66	7000+	
1591			378,000 Arrobas
1612	99		
1618			500,000 Arrobas

The history of Pernambuco cannot be separated from the development of the sugar industry. There were periods of great prosperity and periods when sugar was less dominant, often due to fluctuations in the market place. Nevertheless, since the Sixteenth Century, sugar has always been an important part of the Pernambucan economy. Little more than five years after arriving in Pernambuco Duarte Coelho visited Portugal, found backers to invest in engenhos (sugar mills), wrote the King that fields of cane were planted and one large engenho was nearing completion. A few years later, in 1550, there were five 'Engenhos' in use and by 1576 Pero de Magalhães Gandavo reported that Pernambuco had about 1000 (Portuguese) inhabitants and twenty-three engenhos (three or four not yet completed). At this early date in a good year, Pernambuco produced more than 50,000 arrobas or 800 tons (1 arroba = 32 lbs ~ 14.75 kg) of sugar. This production would increase ten-fold by the time the Dutch invaded.

Cultivating and refining sugar required both a large capital investment and a lot of heavy labor. Aside from Duarte Coelho's return to Portugal to find investors for his first engenho, we know only in general where or whom this investment capital came from for the first few engenhos: probably Lisbon merchants. We do know that slaves provided the labor force. While free and slave labor of indigenous peoples was used, its use was limited not only by diminishing populations but also by the main attributes of culture. Two cultural factors were: First, neither the Tabajaras nor the Caetés peoples were wealth accumulators. As Stuart Schwartz expressed it, "Once a man had enough to eat and a few new tools and weapons, why should he want or work for more?" Second, even with Tupi speaking peoples such as the Tabajara, who already practiced agriculture, cultivating crops was women's work. So it is no surprise to find, as early as 1542, Duarte Coelho already repeating his request to the crown for permission to import African slaves. Unlike the indigenous peoples, Africans would be in a strange new land, without family or familiarity with the environment, thus newly arrived African slaves had nowhere to run and no one to hide them. In 1552, one report said there were already more than a thousand African slaves in Pernambuco. In a later report on the number of African slaves in Brazil, from 1585, a Jesuit wrote that "...there were 14,000, a majority of whom were in Pernambuco." While throughout this period until the Dutch invasion, sugar production varied from year to year, as a result of natural events such as the epidemics around 1560 and 1616 and the droughts of the 1580 and 1584, on the whole, the number of engenhos, the amount of sugar refining, and the number of African slaves increased steadily (see table).

=== Portuguese Pernambuco under the Hapsburgs ===
The period 1580―1630 when the Dutch invaded Pernambuco has been labeled the "Golden age of Pernambuco". This golden age coincided with the assumption of the crown of Portugal by the Spanish Hapsburgs (1580 to 1640).

==== The Spanish Empire as background ====
During the reign of Philip II of Spain (in Portugal, Philip I) the Hapsburgs ruled most of Europe and European colonies worldwide. Philip II ruled all the Spains, he was the effective master of Flanders, Artois, and Franche-Comté disputed ruler of Holland and Zeeland. He was king of Naples and Sicily and through his control of Sardinia and Milan, kept regular communication with his cousins in Austria, thus, the Hapsburgs almost encircled France. When he assumed the crown of Portugal his domains in Africa included Oran, Ceuta, Tangier, the Canaries plus he gained various islands including Madeira, the Azores, Cabo Verde, and of course the Portuguese outposts in Africa and the Far East. Pernambuco, as did all of Brazil and other Spanish royal domains enjoyed both the privileges and penalties of being appurtenant to the empire of the Hapsburg In the late Sixteenth Century, Pernambuco benefited from the rule of Philip II (of Spain). As the Seventeenth Century advanced Pernambuco would experience the penalties of belonging to the same empire, particularly with the invasion of the Dutch in 1630.

==== The internal affairs of the Captaincy ====
In the late Sixteenth Century, the Portuguese continued to expand their settlements in Brazil. Whereas Bahia, under the aegis of the governors-general, was a base for the very successful expansion of Portuguese Brazil Southward into what would become the heart of modern-day Brazil, Pernambuco was a base for the somewhat less successful expansion of Portugal into the areas to the North. These attempts to settle areas North of Pernambuco are important to the history of Pernambuco for several reasons. First, the Potiguar people inhabited a large stretch of the coast North of Pernambuco, and while those Potiguar nearest Pernambuco frequently traded peacefully with the Portuguese, most often the Potiguar allied with the French as they repeatedly tried to establish French outposts or settlements on the coast North of Pernambuco. This alliance constituted a continuing threat to Pernambuco. Many Pernambucans including Martim Leitão, Manuel de Mascarenhas Homem, and Jeronimo de Albuquerque Maranhão figured in expeditions against the French and the Potiguar and these expeditions began at least as early as the 1570s However, aside from the threat of the French and Potiguar alliance, what may have been most important was that these expeditions were outfitted and supplied through merchants in Pernambuco. In the early Seventeenth Century, the extended visits (sometimes more residences) of the Governors-general can be understood in terms of the expansion of Portuguese colonization of Brazil. Between 1602 and 1619 four governors-general spent eight years in Pernambuco instead of their capital Bahia, nominally inspecting the captaincy and directing such expeditions to the Northern coast, and, at the same time, involved in the commerce of outfitting and supplying these Northward expeditions. There is little doubt that the youth of the fourth donatário, Duarte de Albuquerque Coelho, absent Pernambuco and who had inherited in 1602 at the age of ten was a factor in the presence of the governors-general and the ability of the governors-general and members of his entourage to profit in Pernambuco. It would be 1620 before the Fourth donatário would be allowed to send his brother, Matias de Albuquerque as his representative to exert direct familial control over his captaincy. There were several disagreements between the Governor-general Dom Luis de Sousa, Conde do Prado and his appointees, and Matias de Albuquerque. That Matias was successful in recovering a substantial part of the privileges due to his brother can be seen in his refusal to allow the departing Governor-general Dom Luis de Sousa to debark when his Lisbon bound ship called at Recife when the governor-general was leaving Brazil. That this affront to a member of the titled nobility resulted in no significant retribution is evidenced by the fact that when the next governor-general, Diogo de Mendonça Furtado, was captured by the Dutch in Bahia, Matias de Albuquerque was appointed as successor and governor-general of Brazil.

== Dutch Brazil ==
When Portugal came under the Spanish Hapsburgs kings, the Dutch had been in revolt against the Spanish crown for twelve years. The Dutch targeted Brazil first with limited success at Bahia in 1624, and subsequently in Pernambuco and the Northern coast of Brazil starting in 1630. They would finally be expelled in 1654.

=== Invasion ===
Dutch Brazil flag

The Dutch West India Company had gathered considerable intelligence on the defenses of Pernambuco both by the capture of ships at sea and during their previous occupation of Bahia in 1624. As a result, the fleet commander Hendrick Corneliszoon Loncq and the land forces colonel Jonckheer Diederick van Waerdenburgh were well informed as to the weaknesses of Pernambuco's defense. Due to considerable delay by the Dutch in preparing the assault, the Spanish Crown was informed well in advance. The King dispatched Matias de Albuquerque to deal with the threat. He was dispatched with 3 caravels, a few troops, and some munitions. Arriving at Pernambuco in October 1629 he found local defenses had largely been dismantled and available defense forces were only 200 soldiers and 650 militiamen. Pernambuco would face a Dutch assault with sixty-seven ships, 7000 men, and 1,170 guns. In February 1630 the Flemish fleet sighted Pernambuco and landed on the shore of Pau Amarelo. The invading troops went into the village of Recife, which might present a greater resistance due to already having built a fortress.

The initial Dutch assault was completely successful, less the destruction of the shipping and the sugar warehouses which the defenders burned to deprived the Dutch of that booty. The defenders turned to guerrilla warfare, which proved fairly successful. Both the Dutch and the Portuguese endured a long struggle with disease and short rations as much of an enemy as were the opposing forces. There was an unsuccessful attempt to mount a relief armada. The war became one of attrition with the Dutch slowly gaining advantage over a period of years, however, very slowly, at considerable cost, and providing very little in the way of profits to the Dutch Went India Company.

=== The Governance of Johan Maurits ===
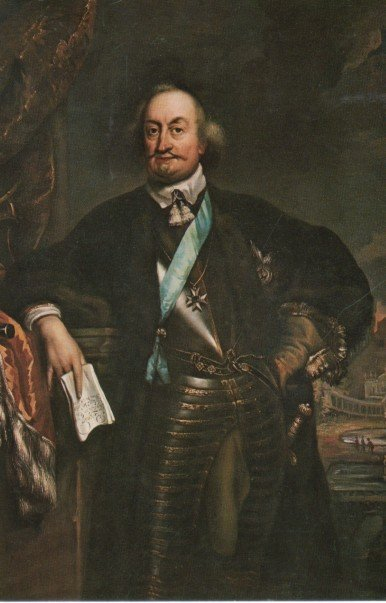
Johan Maurits, Governor of Dutch Brazil

"The most remarkable man ever associated with the sugar industry"

Johan Maurits began campaigns against the Portuguese resistance with an attack on Porto Calvo to the south of Recife. The commander of the Portuguese, Giovanni Baguoli, chose to meet the Dutch in a set battle at Porto Calvo and was defeated. After consolidating his forces and occupying Fort Povoação, Maurits pursued the resistance forces to the São Francisco River and, failing to engage them before they crossed, managed to negotiate an agreement with the local Potiguar people to prevent the Portuguese from crossing back into Pernambuco.

Although Maurits would prove exceptionally tolerant for his day and age (allowing considerable freedom of worship, establishing and maintaining good relationships with remaining indigenous peoples, and even refusing to return African slaves who had deserted to the Dutch) the reality of the age and the reality of sugar economy was based on large landholdings, expensive machinery, and slavery. In 1637 Johan Maurits dispatched a force under Colonel Hans Coen against São Jorge. Thus Dutch Brazil was able to re-establish a supply of African slaves, a key to increasing sugar production in Pernambuco.

After a campaign against Sergipe, to the South, prompted by guerilla raids (sent by Baguoli) across the São Francisco River and an invitation by the Tapuya tribes to occupy Ceará, to the North, Maurits was urged to attack Bahia. This unsuccessful campaign was undertaken in 1638. Despite some initial successes, the Dutch found that their forces were outnumbered by the defender and ultimately Maurits withdrew. Maurits described Bahia as "a cat not to be taken without gloves"

In 1638, the Hapsburg crown at long last was able to send an armada to help expel the Dutch from Brazil's Northeast. Both sides in this struggle suffered from logistic problems, both finding it difficult to mount forces and to feed and supply their forces. The commander of the Spanish armada was Dom Fernão de Mascarenhas, conde da Torre. The armada sailed with forty-six ships and 5,000 soldiers. En route the armada lost 3,000 men to disease. When on January 10, 1639, the fleet hove because Recife's concern was high in Pernambuco. However, instead of landing, the Conde da Torre decided to sail on to Bahia intent on recruiting replacements for his much-reduced landing forces. In the meantime, the Dutch had reinforced Pernambuco with 1200 men. After a ten-month stay in Bahia, the Conde da Torre again sailed for Recife. Due to adverse winds and currents, his forces overshot Recife eventually engaging with the Dutch fleet off Itamaracá. The fleet engagement was not decisive, but after the inconclusive fighting broke off, the currents prevented the Spanish fleet of heavier ships from sailing back to Pernambuco. With rations again short, the land forces, under Luis Barbalho, were put ashore to march back overland to Bahia having to pass through Pernambuco and Dutch territory all the way. That much of this force made it back to Bahia was largely a function of support from the Portuguese colonists still resident in Pernambuco.

During the preceding struggles, the Portuguese decided not to give quarter to any of their Dutch opponents. This decision was put in writing and when the Dutch took a Portuguese ship as a prize, the instruction was discovered. Later when Luis Barbalho wrote Johan Maurits for quarter for his sick and injured during the long march to Bahia, Maurits responded by forwarding a copy of the letter Luis Barbalho had written to implement this policy and, of course, refusing quarter in return. After the failure of the armada to expel the Dutch, the recall of various officials by the crown, the arrival of Dutch reinforcements for Dutch Pernambuco, and the arrival of Dom Jorge de Mascarenhas (newly the marquis of Mantalvão and the first Governor-general to bear the title of viceroy) the two men, Montalvão and Maurits, both humane according to the standards of the time, negotiated an end to the slaughter of prisoners that occurred on both sides and returned the struggle for control of Pernambuco and Northeastern Brazil to a less barbaric level in which quarter was again extended to a defeated enemy.

In 1640, the house of Braganza wrested the throne of Portugal from the Hapsburgs. While Philip IV of Spain did not willingly let Portugal go and war with Spain was always a possibility for years to follow, Portugal was able to negotiate a truce with the Dutch, which although mostly observed in Europe and seldom and reluctantly observed outside of Europe, it did, with two important exceptions, mark the beginning of the closure of Johan Maurits' military exploits. The first of these exceptions was another expedition to Africa in the interest of securing slaves. The second was the occupation of Maranhão in 1641. As Pernambuco required slaves to support its sugar industry the African expedition was important to Pernambuco whereas the occupation of Maranhão was not so significant to the history of Pernambuco.

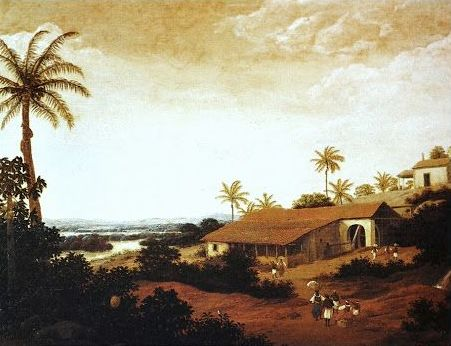
View of a sugar-producing farm (engenho) in colonial Pernambuco by Dutch painter Frans Post (17th century)

"During his stay in Brazil Johan Maurits gathered around him a carefully selected entourage of forty-six scholars, scientists, artists, and craftsmen from the Netherlands, all of whom had their own special functions and assignment. Piso studied tropical diseases and their remedies, Marcgraf made scientific collections of the fauna, flora, and geography of Brazil and Angola, in addition to astronomical and meteorological observations; while half a dozen painters, including Frans Post and Albert Eckout...filled their portfolios with sketches of every aspect of local life and culture." He was also appreciative of the need to win the cooperation of the residents of Pernambuco. A Protestant himself he tolerated the Catholic priests and friars (excepting the Jesuits). He permitted Jewish religious practices, including the establishment of two synagogues in Recife, in the face of complaints from both Catholics and Protestants. Moreover, he left undisturbed the religious activities of both Africans and the indigenous tribes. He reduced taxation and allowed the planters liberal credit. He established local representative governments on which both Portuguese and Dutch residents served. He maintained strict discipline among the soldiers in the garrison.

Under Maurits' rule Recife, which had been chiefly a village at Olinda's port that supported shipping and catered to seamen, was renamed Mauritsstad. Using bridges to nearby islands, Maurits laid out the capital of New Holland and set it on course to become the capital city of Pernambuco that Recife is today. Partly to induce planters to build their own homes in the new city Johan Maurits built two country-seats. He built a dike system to bring in water from the river and in the sandy wasteland, he brought in fertile soil and planted a garden with all kinds of fruit trees from Brazil as well as imported trees. The garden had two thousand coconut palms, which gives an idea of the scale of the plantings. He also brought all kinds of birds, parrots, macaws, wading birds, pheasants, guinea fowl, ducks, swans, and doves beyond counting. He also had animals brought in including tigers, ounces, anteaters, apes, monkeys, tapirs, etc.

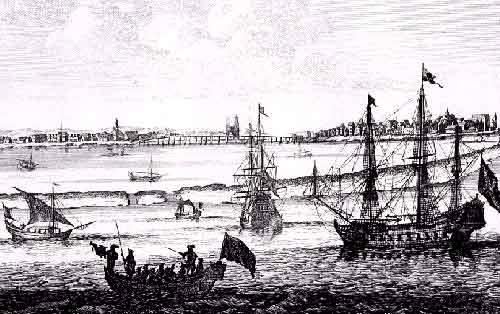
Recife or Mauritsstad – Capital of the Nieuw Holland in Brazil

A final witness to the capabilities of Johan Maurits is found in Southey's description of the completion of the principal bridge (among several bridges) Maurits had built for Recife. "A great work yet remained, to connect Mauritius with Recife by a bridge. The architect went on building stone pillars, until he came to the deepest part, before giving up the attempt in despair. There were many persons who rejoiced at the failure, an outcry was raised against Mauritz, as the projector of an impracticable scheme. He took it into his own hands. In two months it was completed, and the bridge opened."

=== Jews in Dutch Brazil ===
"Relatively few of the Dutch ever learned to speak Portuguese fluently...and there is no recorded instance of an 'Old Christian' Portuguese of Pernambuco having troubled to learn Dutch." Writers of this period explain that Jews in Pernambuco succeeded because they spoke both languages. Despite this essential function hatred of the Jews was the one point on which Dutch Calvinists and the Catholic friars were united. Both complained that Jews congregated publicly, married with Christians, converted Christians, circumcised Christians, employed Christian servants in their home, and kept Christian women as concubines. Johan Maurits ignored these complaints. Johan Maurits was well-liked by the Jews in Dutch Brazil.

=== Revolt against the Dutch ===
"The Dutch had basically imposed their control over an existing colony that had already achieved a certain level of social and institutional development so that whatever the Dutch introduced was a thin overlay." After the departure of Johan Maurits in 1644 and the reduction of Dutch forces, a rebellion broke out in 1645. Although the Dutch would lose any effective control of the interior by 1648, they were not expelled from Mauritsstade (Recife) until 1654.

The initial leaders of the Portuguese were Andre Vidal de Negreiros and João Fernandes Vieira. These were supported by the actions of António Teles da Silva, the Governor-general in Bahia, whose machinations, included dispatching troops and suborning Major Dirk Hooghstraten, commander of the key fortress of Pontal de Nazaré to surrender the fort. The forces that Teles da Silva dispatched included two that would figure large in Pernambucan lore: an Afro-Brazilian unit under Henrique Dias, and an indigenous unit under Filipe Camarão. The first significant engagement occurred at the Monte das Tabocas where the Dutch forces armed with firearms were defeated by Fernades Viera's rebels armed mostly with pikes, swords, scythes, and makeshift weapons.

In the meantime, two Portuguese regiments dispatched by the Governor-general landed at Tamandaré. These regiments under Martim Soares Moreno and André Vidal de Negreiros, after occupying Serinhaem, advanced on Cabo de Santo Agostinho and the fortress of Pontal de Nazaré, where Hooghstraten as previously agreed surrendered without a fight.

The Dutch no longer controlled the countryside and were besieged in Recife. Portugal still threatened by Spain on the peninsula could do little. The Dutch were the best situated to break the impasse, however, for reasons largely involving conflicting interests among the United Provinces and the Dutch East and West India companies, they failed to master the rebellion.

In 1646 the Dutch, deciding that Dutch Brazil would never be safe with the Portuguese in Bahia, occupied Itaparica Island opposite Salvador, Bahia. This action would elicit a response from Portugal, but it did not serve to break the stalemate in Pernambuco.

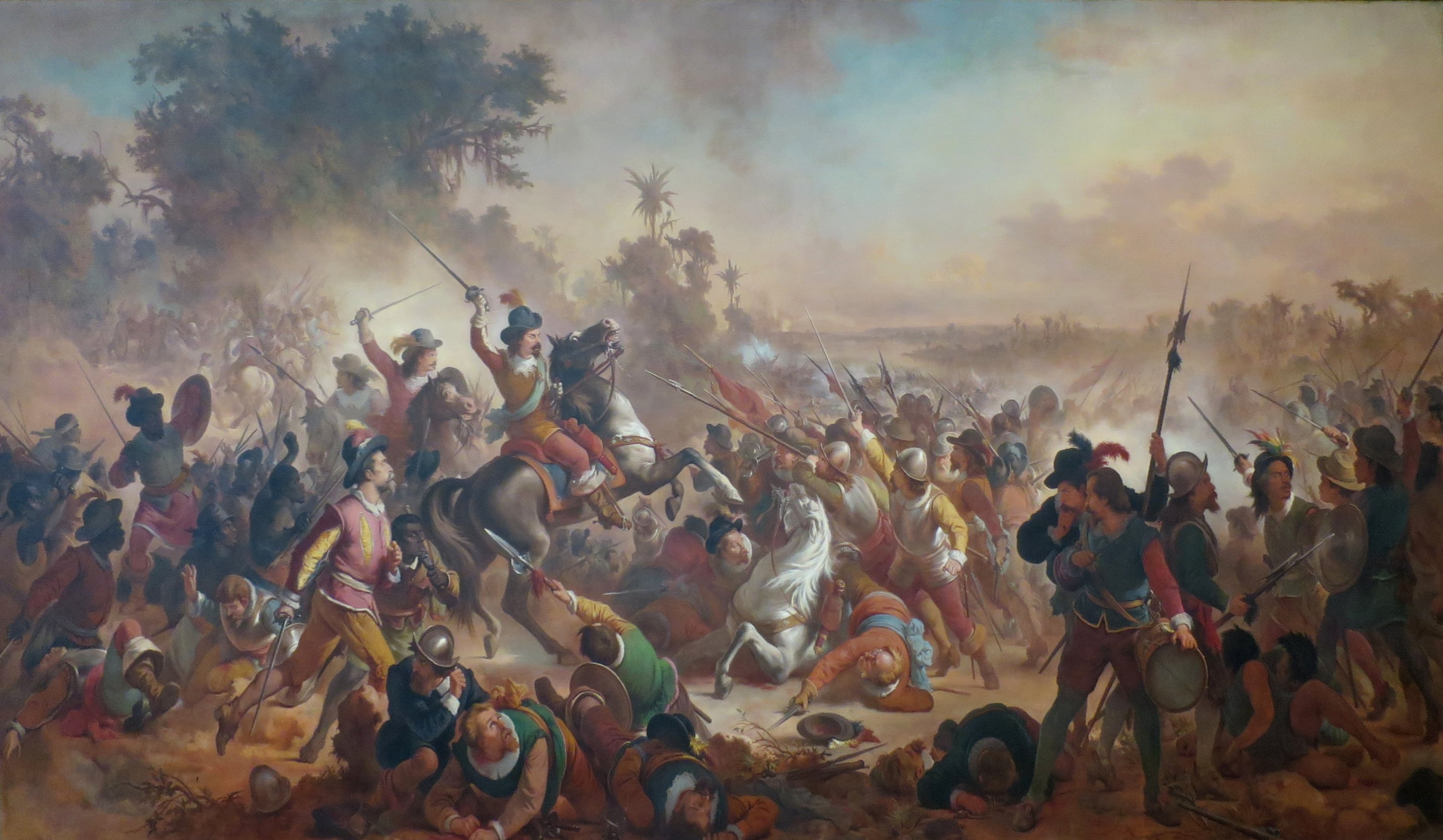
The Portuguese victory at the Battle of Guararapes, ended Dutch presence in Brazil.

The next important action in Pernambuco was when the Dutch marched out to do battle under General Von Scope. The two sides met in the Battle of First Guarapes (1648). As had happened at the battle of Monte das Tabocas the Dutch withdrew after nightfall leaving the Pernambucan forces to find themselves the victors the next morning. This amounted to a boost to Portuguese morale but did not affect the standoff between the belligerents.

The next year, 1649, having in the interim made a raid on Bahia with considerable success, the Dutch again came out to fight in Pernambuco. Once again the forces met in the second battle of Guarapes. The Dutch early on took the high ground which had little concealment. The Portuguese, under Francisco Barreto, remained among the trees at the foot of the hill. The Dutch grew thirsty in the tropical sun on the barren hilltop and decided to withdraw. When the main body was passing a narrow spot the Portuguese attacked. Although the Dutch fought well for a while, confusion set in and the Portuguese victory became a route.

Despite the rout, the situation changed little. The Portuguese still controlled the countryside, but could not take Recife because of Dutch sea power. Both the Dutch and the Pernambucans had much to discourage them. Neither side had a good prospect. The ultimate surrender of the Dutch mostly resulted from the outbreak of war between the English and the Dutch beginning in 1652. This diminished the ability of the Dutch to project sea power against Portugal and Brazil. Now the Dutch could not blockade Lisbon if King João sent ships against Recife. This he did in 1653. With Portuguese ships now supporting the Pernambucans, the Dutch surrendered Recife in January 1654.

== A slow recovery from the Dutch incursion: 1650 to 1700 ==
=== External influences ===
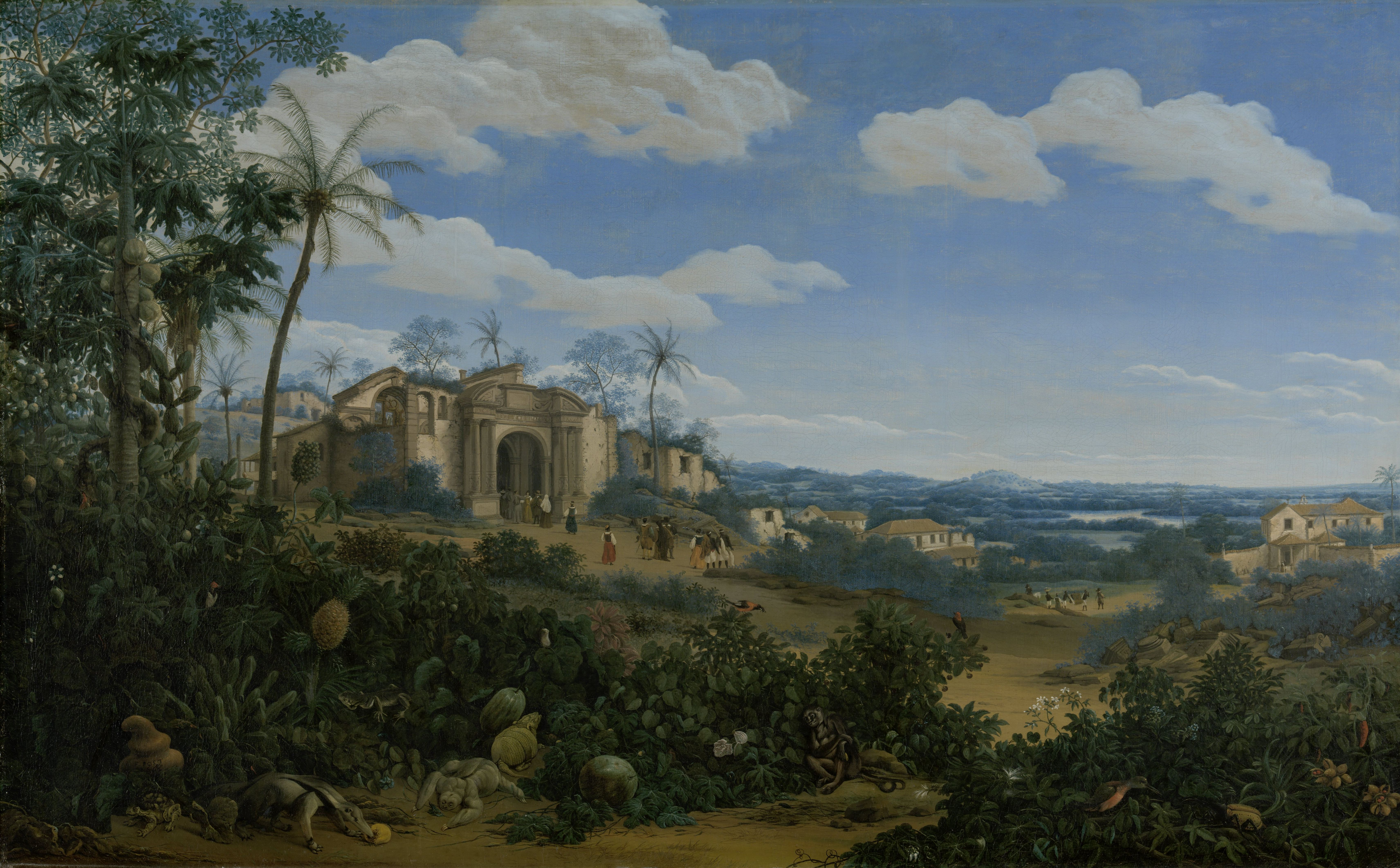
View of Olinda, ca. 1660, Frans Post

Heroic as the Brazilian Portuguese were in the struggle to expel the Dutch, their ultimate success was largely dependent on external factors. The Dutch dominated the seaways, Portugal itself was under constant threat by a land attack from Spain and a blockade by the Dutch. The failure of the Dutch to immediately counter their expulsion from Recife can be laid to three principal considerations: the exhaustion of the Dutch from their war with England, the nearly complete bankruptcy of the West Indies Company, and an overriding concern with the Dutch Baltic trade which was threatened in 1655 by a crisis between Denmark and Sweden. After extended dissension among the United Provinces, and mediation by the not disinterested English, the Dutch period in Brazil was only finally settled diplomatically in 1662 by Treaty

=== Internal problems in post-Dutch Pernambuco ===
==== Competition from Caribbean sugar ====
As early as 1633, the rise in sugar prices caused by the Dutch invasion of Pernambuco had Barbados experimenting with growing sugar cane. By 1643, Barbadian sugar was for sale in Europe, and countries with colonies in the Caribbean were rushing to follow suit. By the time the Dutch were expelled from Pernambuco and with the establishment of their sugar colonies, the major European powers began excluding Brazilian sugar from their markets. "In the 1630's, about 80 percent of the sugar sold in London originated in Brazil. By 1670, that figure had fallen to 40 percent, and by 1690, to only 10 percent". The sugar colonies in the Caribbean now competed for slaves and this raised that cost.

==== Quilombos ====
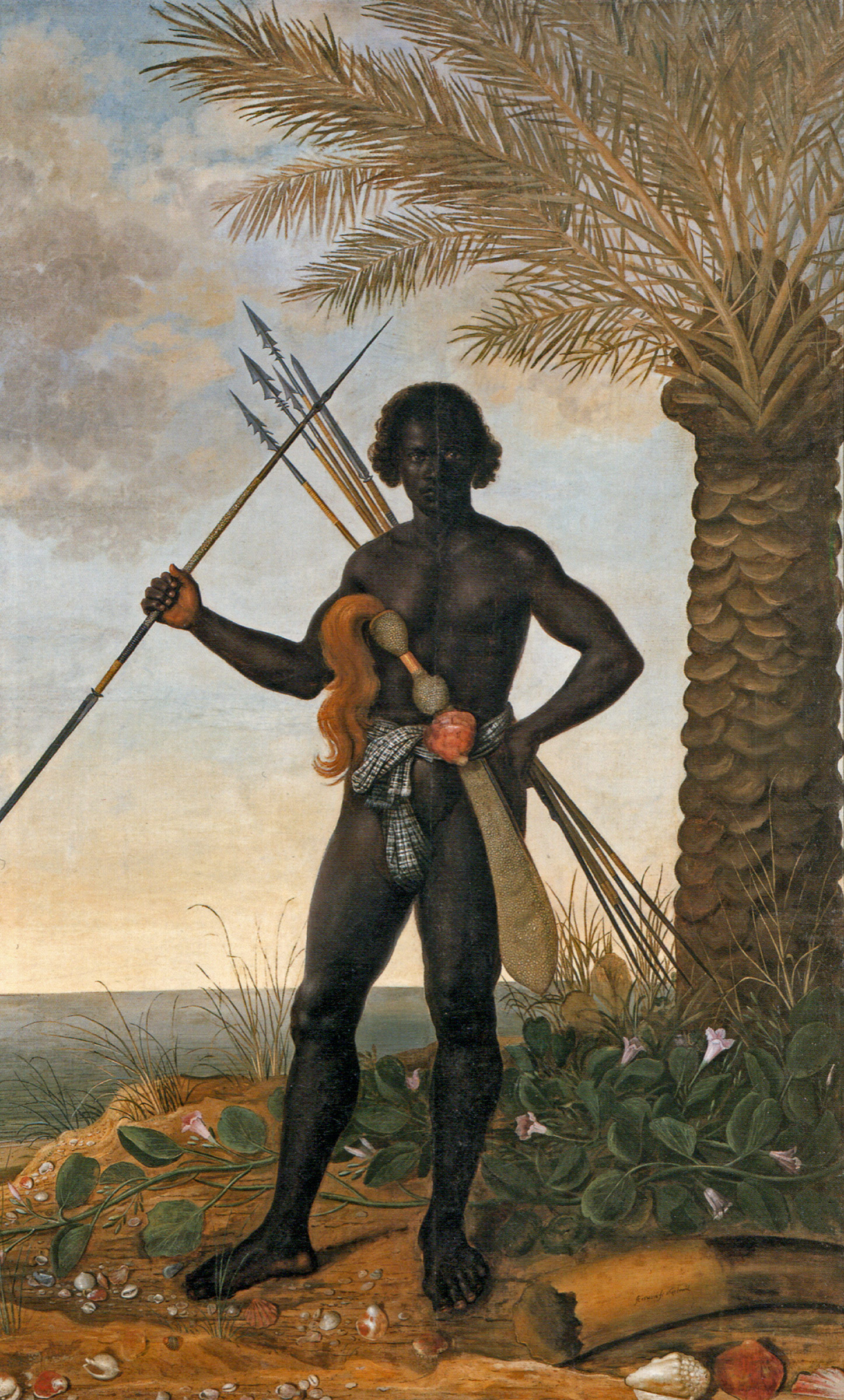
Albert Eckhout, African warrior at the time of Ganga Zumba and leader of the Palmares quilombo

Runaway African slaves and their quilombos (settlements) had long been a problem in Pernambuco and throughout Brazil. Well before the Dutch incursion governors had appointed capitães-do-mato (bush captains) to hunt out quilombos and recapture slaves. However, in addition to a large number of Africans imported to Pernambuco, the turmoil and destruction of the guerrilla war against the Dutch provided ample opportunities for slaves to escape and take refuge in Quilombos. Alagoas, which was part of Pernambuco until 1817, was the site of Palmares, the largest and most famous quilombo in Brazil. Palmares, although dispersed for defense, was nevertheless a small city, with streets and residences along with cultivated fields and at some point self-styled as the Republic of Palmares. Moreover, Africans were not content to live a stone-age existence without metal tools, firearms, and other implements and conveniences, the principal source of which was to raid Portuguese settlements. Thus, aside from the Portuguese wanting to reclaim their escaped slaves, the Portuguese were under threat of attack from the quilombos. As early as 1627 Governor-general Diogo Botelho ordered an attack against a quilombo near the Real river, with limited success. The Dutch likewise attacked Palmares unsuccessfully with 300 Muskateers and 700 Indians. After the Dutch were expelled there was a period of relative non-aggression against Palmares, but beginning in 1672 there began a period of repeated attacks on Palmares (eight between 1672 1680) culminating in the destruction of Palmares in 1694. This ended the largest and most famous of the quilombos, but a multitude of smaller quilombos would remain for decades.

==== Other factors ====
In the 1680s Europe, including Portugal and by extension Brazil, fell into depression, there were perioding epidemics in Brazil throughout this period and in 1693-55 the discovery of gold far away from Pernambuco disrupted the economy and further raised costs. Pernambuco was recovering, but at a glacial pace.

== Pernambuco in the Golden Age of Brazil ==
The discovery of gold in Minas Gerais in 1693-95 and later diamonds (sometime before 1726) had the predictable result of starting a gold rush. No part of Brazil or the Portuguese world was unaffected. So many people rushed to the goldfields with so little preparation that some starved for lack of food. Food when available sold for 25 to 50 times its price on the coast. Although Recife was far from the goldfields, Pernambuco was not unaffected. At this time the Captaincy of Pernambuco encompassed about four or five times as much territory as does the modern state of Pernambuco and extended far into the backlands including interior lands that would later be attached to other states. The sertão (backlands) already was used for cattle ranching and in particular, the valley of the São Francisco River became a popular route feeding would-be miners, equipment, and supplies to the goldfields. The mining boom inevitably diverted both free men and slaves from all Brazilian coastal areas including Pernambuco and drove up prices. While Stuart Schwartz observes that "...even at the height of the period of gold production, earnings from sugar were always greater than those from gold or any other commodity," the gold rush severely impacted the sugar industry in the first half of the Eighteenth Century. For example, the price of slaves one of the principal costs in the sugar economy went from 40 milreis before the discovery of gold to 200 milreis in 1723. Thus the sugar-producing areas of Pernambuco struggled against inflation getting relief mostly when there were wars in Europe.

=== War of the Mascates ===
The eminent Twentieth Century historian C. R. Boxer, in describing the coeval accounts of the War of the Mascates commented, "So much hard lying is involved in this conflict of evidence that the exact truth is probably unascertainable...."

The War of the Mascates evidences the tensions between the planters and senhores de engenho (the landed elites) in colonial Brazil and the mascates (merchants) of Recife. The "War" (there was considerable shooting but little loss of life) has elements of class struggle.

After the expulsion of the Dutch, Olinda, then the capital of Pernambuco and the civic and religious center, was left in shambles. Yet Olinda was the municipality of the planters, the local aristocracy. Recife, formerly merely the port facility for Olinda, had been developed into a thriving center of commerce populated by wealthy, more recently arrived merchants to whom most of the landed aristocracy of Pernambuco were heavily indebted.

The governor was appointed by the crown, the local municipal offices were controlled by the planters. The wealthy merchants resented the political controls exercised by the planters, and the planters resented being indebted to the merchants. The governors frequently favored wealthy merchants.

In 1710, after many denied requests, the crown granted Recife municipal status. The governor, anticipating resistance from the planters, decided on a secret and clumsy, strategy to implement the new municipality. The planters seized upon his secrecy to contend that the new status for Recife had not been authorized by the king. The planters reacted, the governor reacted, the governor was shot at and decamped to Bahia. The planters attacked Recife, although serious violence was averted by clerical intercession. The planters and their allies regrouped in Olinda where, in a precursor to the declaration of an independent republic in the Nineteenth Century, there was at least a minimally credible suggestion that Pernambuco be declared an independent republic.

For several months the situation was subdued, but then the merchants and their allies rebelled. After some minimal violence, the planters and their adherents laid siege to Recife. The siege was successful to the extent of isolating and inconveniencing the residents of Recife, however, despite a need to subsist mostly by eating shellfish and other seafood, Recife was able to sustain itself until the crown appointed new governor arrived. The new governor came with a pardon for the rebels and relative peace was restored temporarily. However, the municipal status of Recife was also affirmed and the planters again took offense. The governor again sided with the merchants and persecuted the planters. He too like his predecessor, Sebastiåo de Castro, accrued an attempted assassination.

However accurate or exaggerated the descriptions of the depravity of the governor his excesses were eventually quelled when António de Albuquerque, twice governor of Rio de Janeiro stopped in Pernambuco en route to Lisbon. Apprised of the situation he presented his Pernambucan relative's case to the king. The king issued a new set of instructions to the Governor, the instructions arrived in time to free a shipload of planters who were already chained and on board a ship about to sail to Portugal. In 1715 the crown dispatched a new governor and residents of Pernambuco finally felt the troubles were ended, though many families of the colony's elites were ruined."

== Pernambuco in the late eighteenth century ==
Sebastião Carvalho José Carvalho e Melo, Marquis of Pombal, was the dominant figure in the history of the Portuguese empire in the late Eighteenth Century. "Portuguese historians contradict one another in their treatment of the powerful prime minister, some praising him as a savior and other damning him as a madman. Brazilian historians have treated him more consistently. They gratefully acknowledge the contributions he made...to the formation of their country." The period is logically divided into the period he was in power and the aftermath of his rule.

=== The age of Pombal (1750–1777) ===
While gold and diamond mining continues up to the current day in the last half of the Eighteenth Century the earliest discoveries, particularly those areas where gold and diamonds were most easily extracted gradually began producing less. Sugar, with its slave labor requirements, remained the best measure of the wealth and well-being of Brazil and particularly Pernambuco. Pombal instituted reforms, such as boards of inspection in 1751, and the planters complained to no avail. But the real problem in the Pernambucan (and Brazilian) sugar industry was a market problem. Too many countries produced sugar in their Caribbean colonies, driving down the price of sugar and inflating the price of slaves. The price of sugar on the market fell sharply between 1750 and 1755. In the mid-1750s a pombaline company was started and with the outbreak of the Seven Years' War in 1756 the price of sugar rose. Although Bahia had consistently outstripped Pernambuco in sugar production after the Dutch incursion, by 1762 it appears Pernambuco, at least temporarily, regained its preeminence in sugar production. Of course, after the war, the price fell once more. While events such as wars in Europe favorably affected Pernambuco, others, such as the Great Lisbon Earthquake of 1755 seemingly had less effect on Pernambuco.

==== The expulsion of the Jesuits (1759) ====
Pombal's hatred of the Jesuits led to their subsequent expulsion but the impact on Pernambuco was less than in other areas with greater concentrations of indigenous peoples. In coastal Pernambuco, having fewer aldeias (clergy controlled villages) the effect of the expulsion was diminished. Nevertheless, the expulsion did result in the crown confiscation and sale of Jesuit properties. Pombal thought the Jesuits were concealing great wealth in gold and treasure, but searches of confiscated properties yielded no such treasure. An additional effect of the expulsion was in education. The Jesuits had long maintained primacy in education in the Portuguese empire thru their control of the universities at Coimbra and Evora and locally in Olinda by way of their Collegio.

=== From Pombal to Napoleon ===
While Portugal and some areas of Brazil spent the period between Pombal's rule and Napoleon's invasion of Portugal undoing much of Pombal's reforms, Pernambuco continued to experience the ups and downs of the world sugar market. The most significant event in the late Eighteenth Century was external, the slave rebellions in Santo Domingo and Haiti, and the consequent destruction of sugar production there. This marked the beginning of a period of resurgence in the Brazilian and Pernabucan sugar industry. In education, the influence of European thought, especially French thought, was furthered in Pernambuco as the bishop established a seminary in Olinda in 1800.

=== Province of Pernambuco ===
In 1821, the captaincy of Pernambuco became the province of Pernambuco in the Kingdom of Brazil. Its borders have remained relatively unchanged since that time, with the slight change of ceding the south bank of Rio Francisco to Bahia.

== Administrative evolution: a Recapitulation ==
Portuguese coat of arms of Pernambuco

Pernambuco (Captaincy of Duarte Coelho, from 1535). In 1799 it was divided into the provinces of Pernambuco, Ceará, Rio Grande do Norte, and Paraíba. In 1817 it was divided again into Alagoas and Pernambuco. It was governed by donatarios until 1576, when it began to employ capitães-mor appointed by the donatarios. After the Dutch occupation ended in 1654, the Portuguese Crown took over administration. In 1716, the last donatario sold his rights back to the Crown, and Pernambuco became a Crown colony.

- 1535 Donátaria Nova Lusitania.
- 1575 renamed captaincy of Pernambuco.
- 1582 captaincy of Paraíba subordinated to Pernambuco
- 16 Jan 1630 – 28 Jan 1654 Dutch occupation (see Dutch Brazil).
- 1654 subsumed by Governorate (State) of Brazil
- 1656 Ceará subordinated to Pernambuco.
- 1701 captaincy of Rio Grande (Rio Grande de Norte and Paraíba) subordinated to Pernambuco.
- 10 May 1716 Crown colony, captaincy of Pernambuco.
- 1756 captaincy of Itamaraca merged into Pernambuco
- 17 Jan 1799 Captaincy of Ceará split from Pernambuco.
- 1799 captaincy of Paraíba do Norte (later renamed Paraíba) split from Pernambuco
- 1808 Rio Grande de Norte split from Pernambuco
- 07 Mar 1817 - 1 Jul 1817 Republic of Pernambuco (in rebellion).
- 16 Sep 1817 Alagôas captaincy split from Pernambuco.
- 28 Feb 1821 province of United Kingdom of Portugal, Brazil and the Algarves
- 07 Sep 1822 province of empire of Brazil.
- 1824 Comarca of Rio Sao Francisco separated from Pernambuco

== See also ==
- History of Pernambuco
- Captaincies of Brazil
- Iberian Union
- History of Alagoas
