= War of Aperipê =

Article about a colonial conflict mentioned in contemporary sources and history books

Date	1575
Location	Rio Real; Colonial Brazil; Kingdom of Portugal
Result	Portuguese Victory

Belligerents
Kingdom of Portugal	Allied Tupinambá tribes

Commanders and leaders
Luiz de Brito e Almeida	Aperipê Serigy Suruby

Units involved
Unknown	Unknown

Casualties and losses
Unknown	Over 1200 captured

The War of Aperipê, also known as War for the conquest of Sergipe, was a war between native forces in the region of Rio Real led by the catechized native chief (regionaly known as Morubixaba) Aperipê, against Portuguese forces trying to conquer the territory of Sergipe d'el Rei.

In 1575, natives beyond the river Real asked the Portuguese to catechize them. Jesuit Gaspar Lourenço set out with his fellow Jesuit João Salônio, twenty neophytes and a number of soldiers. His successful work would be undone by a royal decree ordering governor-general Luiz de Brito e Almeida to conquer Sergipe to prevent French colonization of the area.

His expedition would be met with hostility by the Tupinambá Morubixabas Aperipê, Suruby and Serigy, who would eventually flee Almeida's expedition. Seeing this as a justification of war, Luiz de Brito e Almeida would pursue and defeat the natives, killing Suruby and bringing Aperipê, Serigy and twelve hundred natives to Bahia, where they would die of disease.

== Background ==
While Colonial Brazil was divided into captaincies in 1530, most of them would not be immediately colonized. This left great swaths of Brazil open to be explored by foreign powers, and native tribes in those captaincies would be de facto independent. Sergipe would be one of those provinces. With death of captain of Bahia Francisco Pereira Coutinho and the inability of his son to colonize the region, the task fell to the King of Portugal. Sergipe would then be known as Sergipe D'El-Rei.

The tribes in Sergipe were allied with France and were the destination of French pirates and native refugees from Bahia fleeing from Portuguese colonization. Thus, they were hostile to the Portuguese, and vicious battles had happened between the two sides with a number of casualties. The murder and cannibalization of Bishop Pero Fernandes Sardinha in 1556 gave Mem de Sá the justification to fight and enslave the Caeté tribes in the Real river, increasing the wariness by the Tupinambá towards the Portuguese and leading to a strengthening of bonds between them and the French. By the 1570s, Portuguese nobles such as Garcia D'Ávila, were pressuring Luiz de Brito e Almeida to conquer the region by force, so as to enslave the local population to work on the plantations in Bahia, and D'Avila also had the interest of expanding his cattle business towards the countryside of Sergipe.

Between 1573 and 1574, however, the natives across the Real river would sue for peace, asking to be catechized. This would prompt the government in Bahia to send Jesuits Gaspar Lourenço and João Salônio, accompanied by twenty neophytes and twenty soldiers led by a captain to convert the region to Catholicism. They would arrive in the region in February 5th and founded the village of São Tomé, possibly near the Piauí River. Chiefs of over thirty villages would go there to be baptized, including Suruby, a famous chief who had killed many Portuguese during the conflicts between the two peoples. Suruby's village would also be converted to Christianity, changing its name to Saint Ignácio.

However, the soldier contingent of the Jesuit expedition was cause of concern for the natives, and their unruly nature and the capture of women for slavery would force many refugees to flee to the tribe of Aperibê.

Nevertheless, in the letters of Ignácio de Toloza, it was reported that, despite constant opposition and sometimes open hostility Lourenço was very successful in endearing himself to previously hostile tribes and the peaceful conversion of the region.

This would change when a royal decree ordered the governor of Bahia to conquer Sergipe by force, undoing the work made by Lourenço.

== Conflict ==
Governor-General Luiz de Brito e Almeida received orders by the Portuguese crown to found an outpost between the Real and Itapicuru rivers. Initially, Almeida gives this task to a rich landowner named Garcia D'Ávila. The outpost would be far from any valuable natural resources and would eventually be defeated by the Tupinambás. Seeing this defeat would lead Almeida to reinforce his own expedition of the Real River. He would be warned by the priests that over 30 settlements under Serigi had made peace with the Jesuits and such an expedition would undo all the progress made, but the economic interests led Almeida to proceed with his plan.

The expedition was met with hostility by the Moxuribás Aperipê, Suraby and Serigy (the latter being chief of the village which would one day become Aracaju), unlike the earlier Jesuit expedition which was received by them in a friendlier manner. With the main expedition moving towards the village of Saint Ignácio, the three chiefs fled the village, which gave Almeida the justification for war. He would then send elements to reinforce the coastal areas while the main body of the expedition would fight the tribal coalition.

Despite being helped and trained to use firearms by the French, the natives of Aperibê were defeated by the Portuguese expedition of Luiz de Brito e Almeida. Suruby would die in the combat, and Aperibê and Serigy would be captured alongside twelve hundred prisoners, who would die of disease in Bahia. The native villages would be set aflame and looted before Almeida returned to Bahia, without setting the outposts for colonization of the region. Despite sources of the time mentioning that Serigy was captured during the war, he would still be a tribal leader fighting the Portuguese until the War of Sergipe in 1590.

== Aftermath ==
The War of Aperipê would set the colonization of Sergipe back by a decade. Taking advantage of the vacuum, the Kiriri peoples would migrate to the region in large numbers, fiercely fighting the Portuguese, with murder and cannibalization of Europeans travelling the land route between Salvador and Olinda a common occurrence.

During the government of governor-general Manuel Teles Barreto, the Kiriri natives of Rio Real would ask for a retinue of Portuguese soldiers to safely cross the territory of Tapuias and Tupinaes to be catechized in Bahia. A council of five members voted in favour of giving a retinue of a hundred and fifty soldiers to the natives, with the exception of council member Cristóvão de Barros, who sees the possibility of treason. The retinue and the Jesuit priests accompanying it would be then ambushed and killed, proving Barros right.

Governor-General Manuel Teles de Barreto would then order the captains of Pernambuco and Ilha de Itamaracá to prepare a punitive expedition against the natives of Rio Real, but that would be prevented when fighting in Paraíba became a priority.

After the formation of the Iberian Union and the death of Barreto in 1587, there was legitimate concern that the natives of Rio Real and their French Allies would launch an attack on the captaincy of Bahia. Cristóvão de Barros would then find himself with the freedom and resources to launch a punitive expedition against the natives in 1590.

The expedition, which included 150 soldiers (including Mamelucos and French turncoats), six cannon and over forty five hundred native warriors, of which three thousand were Tapuia archers, would defeat the Tupinambás of Rio Real in a conflict that would be known as War of Sergipe (or War of Cerezipe, given the then evolving name of the region).

== Legacy ==
The War of Aperipê has influenced the state of Sergipe. The medals Order of Merit of Aperipê and Order of Merit of Serigy honour the two tribal leaders. The state also honoured the tribal leader by naming the Foundation of Culture and Art Aperipê after him.

The movie director Ilma Flores wrote a historical fiction screenplay set in the War of Aperibê called "A fúria da raça" (The fury of the race), which would be published as a novel in 1997.

== See Also ==
- War of Sergipe
- Portuguese colonization of the Americas
