= War of Sergipe =

Date	1590
Location	Sergipe, Brazil
Result	Iberian Victory
Territorial changes	Sergipe colonized by the Portuguese

Belligerents
Iberian Union	Tupinambás; Kiriris; Caetés

Commanders and leaders
Cristóvão de Barros	Baepeba

Strength
Over 4,000, between European and Native soldiers	Over 20,000

Casualties and losses
Small	2,400 killed, over 4,000 wounded

The War of Sergipe, written in documents of the time as the war of Cerezipe, was a military campaign led by Portuguese forces, under the Iberian Union to conquer the Captaincy of Sergipe from Tupi and Kiriri natives and their French allies.

In the 1570s, the Portuguese attempts to conquer Sergipe peacefully failed and led to the War of Aperipê, where the Tupi tribes around the Rio Real rose against the Portuguese and were met by a retaliatory force under the governor-general of the northern half of Brazil, Luiz de Brito e Almeida. While he originally intended to permanently settle the region, the Portuguese force left without the establishment of a permanent outpost in the region, and colonization would be delayed by a decade.

In the mid-1580s, Governor-General Manuel Teles de Barreto would cede 150 Portuguese and Mameluco and 300 native soldiers to escort Kiriri peoples from Sergipe through Tapuia territory between Bahia and Sergipe. This would turn out to be a trap, and the soldiers were ambushed and killed. After a royal order by Phillip II of Portugal and Spain, Portuguese captain Cristóvão de Barros sallied from Bahia to conquer Sergipe.

== Background ==
In 1530, Colonial Brazil was divided into captaincies, but the model would not be successful and very few of those would be colonized, with the task of colonizing Sergipe falling to the king of Portugal. With large parts of Brazil not under Portuguese hands, French took advantage of the vacuum to ally with the local tribes in captaincies like Sergipe and Paraíba.

In 1574, Jesuit priest Gaspar Lourenço tried to proselitize the hostile region around Rio Real, but the task failed when a royal decree forced governor-geral Luiz Brito e Almeida to conquer the region by force, and Tupinambá tribes under Moxuribá (Cacique) Aperipê and allied chiefs rose to oppose the Portuguese in the War of Aperipê, but were defeated by the Portuguese expedition. However, Luiz Brito left without building the outpost ordered by Portugal. The Kiriri peoples would migrate to the region afterwards, and would be fiercely opposed to the Portuguese. The Kiriri are mentioned to be under Cacique Baepeba, but other sources also cite Baepeba to be a cacique from the Caeté.

In 1586, the Kiriri under Baepeba from Sergipe approached Governor-General Manuel Teles de Barreto in Bahia, asking for an escort, which would be granted by a council of five, with the only vote against it being given by captain Cristóvão de Barros, expecting a betrayal. As predicted, the escort would be ambushed and killed, but due to the ongoing conquest of Paraíba, a punitive expedition was not able to be launched against the Tupinambás. Taking advantage of the death of governor-general Barreto in 1587, Barros would wage a campaign against Caeté tribes in the nearby São Francisco River to avenge the death and cannibalization of his father, Antonio Cardoso de Barros.

In the late 1580s, violence between natives and Portuguese increased, with over 500 murders of white settlers by natives, encouraged by their French allies. It seemed clear that the French and their allies in Sergipe were set to attack Bahia. On top of that, the growth of the colony demanded increased contact between Salvador and Olinda. Travel by boat in the rivers was made impossibal by the French ships, while the land routes through Sergipe were dangerous due the high chance or travelers being murdered or eaten. The Portuguese were also interested in the large amount of natural resources, particularly Brazil wood, in the areas around the Real River inhabited by the hostile tribes, the Portuguese were also interested in the enlavement of natives to work in the plantations in Bahia.

With all that context, in August 1587, the colonial government declared to have a "just" cause of war, and started building their forces under Cristóvão de Barros.

== The Conflict ==
=== The forces ===
On the Portuguese side, Cristóvão de Barros amassed over 150 soldiers (among the Portuguese, mameluco and French soldiers were also present) and a thousand natives. Of those, 400 of them would be given by Jesuit villages in Bahia. An additional three thousand archers were given by allied Tapuia tribes. This force would be supported by six cannons and sixty cavalrymen.

The forces of Baepeba had around twenty thousand warriors, this force would eventually concentrate in the town ruled by Baepeba, a defensive position with three palisade walls that could support each other. It is believed that the town was located somewhere in the Vaza-Barris River

=== The combat ===
Cristóvão de Barros set from Bahia in late 1590 travelling along the coast, with Antônio Fernandes leading the vanguard and the rearguard would be commanded by Sebastião de Faria, who in 1587 led a flotilla of five ships to defend the Recôncavo Baiano from an English attack. As the army started to move inland, it had to cross large rivers and to ground marshes for the artillery to pass. Cristóvão would set Álvaro Rodrigues and Rodrigo Martins to raze the villages, forcing their inhabitants to flee towards a well defended central position.

Initially the Portuguese forces found themselves in a difficult situation, due to the defenders being numerically superior and in a strong position, but Armador de Aguiar would be sent to scout the region, and would then find three enemy spies who would then be used as guides. With that advantage, the attackers would break the siege, forcing the defending natives to retreat. The defenders took six hundred casualties over the Portuguese six.

At some point during the Portuguese advance, Caciques Japaratuba and Pacatuba would surrender to the forces of Cristóvão de Barros, hoping that their villages would be spared. Japaratuba would go with twelve of his archers to the land of the late tribal chief Siriri, and there the two sides would parlay. The natives would then do their traditional rituals, to which Cristóvão de Barros took part. From there, they went to the village of his brother Pacatuba, who would also surrender.

With the countryside conquered, Cristóvão's forces would march towards the town of Baepeba, and put it under siege. An early skirmish would remove the defender's access to their water source, the first palisade wall would be breached on the side where Sebastião de Faria was fighting. This was followed by a breach in the second wall, which led to 300 casualties.

Seeing himself without water and in a disadvantageous position, Baepeba would in January 1st attempt a decisive attack with the warriors in the first two palisade walls. They would be met by a cavalry charge led by Cristóvão de Barros. The natives were not used to cavalry combat, and this tactic took them by surprise. The infantry would stay in place to defend against a possible charge from the remaining troops inside the settlement.

Without options, Baepeba would attempt a daring night attack to catch the attackers by surprise and allow the defenders to make a path out of the town. The initial charge not only made a path for the natives to flee, but also started to force the Portuguese to retreat. Cristóvão rallied the troops and charged the front of the fleeing troops, forcing them to flee back to the town with the Portuguese on their heels. The attackers would enter the town, killing fifteen hundred people and capturing over four thousand.

Once the battle was over and the wounded treated. Cristóvão de Barros would then founded a fort and a settlement in the isthmus of the Cotinguiba River, a town he would name São Cristóvão.

== Aftermath ==
With the conquest completed, Cristóvão would distribute land to those who helped with the war and order captain Rodrigo Martins to pursue the enemy warriors who managed to escape north towards the São Francisco river. King Phillip would give much of the conquered region to Cristóvão, having a stretch of land that went from the Cotinguiba to the São Francisco rivers. He would then pass the government of the captaincy to captain-major Tomé da Rocha, and would return to Bahia, who arrived at the end of the war, and would spend an additional eight months pacifying the region.

The war was an enormous victory for European landowners. Between 1597 and 1607, 203 sesmarias, a Portuguese system of land distribution comparable to fiefs, were given in the captaincy of Sergipe. Those landowners would become an essential part of Sergipe's nobility in the following decades.

Five years after the war, in 1595, the Franco-Spanish War started, and French pirates would attack several parts of Colonial Brazil. A sizable fleet would depart La Rochelle and sink in the coast of Sergipe. The War of Sergipe prevented this fleet to have a safe haven to disembark and over twenty thousand native warriors to support the French ambitions in the region.

== See Also ==
- War of Aperipê
- Portuguese conquest of Maranhão
