= Pero Fernandes Sardinha =

Portuguese priest, first bishop of Brazil

Pedro Fernandes Sardinha
- Bishop of São Salvador da Bahia de Todos os Santos
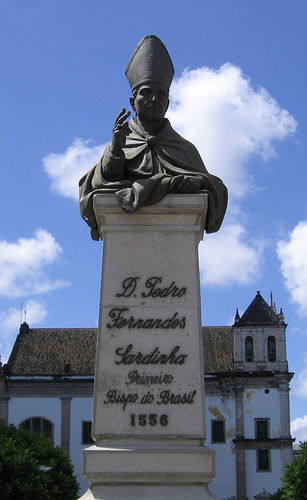
- Bust of Pedro Fernandes Sardinha in Salvador
- Church: Catholic Church
- Diocese: Diocese of São Salvador da Bahia de Todos os Santos
- In office: 25 February 1551 – 2 June 1556
- Predecessor: Diocese erected
- Successor: Pedro Leitão

Orders
- Consecration: 7 February 1552 by Fernando de Meneses Coutinho e Vasconcelos

Personal details
- Born: 1496 Évora, Comarca of Entre-Tejo-e-Odiana, Kingdom of Portugal
- Died: 15 July 1556 (aged 59–60) near present-day Coruripe, Captaincy of Pernambuco, Governorate General of Brazil, Portuguese Empire

D. Pedro Fernandes Sardinha, or Pero Sardinha (1496–1556), was a Portuguese priest, first bishop of Brazil.

== Biography ==
Sardinha was born in Évora. He studied at the University of Paris circa 1525. He was appointed chaplain of the St. Sebastian Church in Madeira Island in 1529, then moving to Lisbon and Porto. In 1545 he was named dean of the Cathedral of Goa in India. After the death of the governor-general João de Castro, Sardinha returned to Portugal, studying Canon Law in Coimbra.

In 1551, Pope Julius III established the Diocese of São Salvador, under the Papal bull Super specula militantis ecclesiae. Sardinha was elected to act as its first bishop. He arrived in the city of Salvador in Bahia on February 25, 1551, at the age of 55. Sardinha was ordained a bishop by Dom Fernando de Menezes Coutinho e Vasconcellos, taking office on June 22, 1552. He resigned on June 2, 1556.

On July 16, 1556, he and his crew were shipwrecked and captured by the Caeté people in the Captaincy of Pernambuco, a Portuguese administrative district that covered the region north of Bahia. The shipwreck occurred in the present-day city of Coruripe in the state of Alagoas at the mouth of the Coruripe River. Sardinha indicated by nods that he was a great prelate of the Portuguese and a priest consecrated to God. He was slaughtered with a mace and devoured, along with his companions.

Dom Pero Fernandes Sardinha was succeeded in the Prime See of Brazil by Dom Pedro Leitão (1519–1573).

== In literature ==
Oswald de Andrade used the episode to date his Anthropophagic Manifesto in 1928.
