= Jerónimo de Albuquerque =

Portuguese colonial administrator in Pernambuco, Brazil

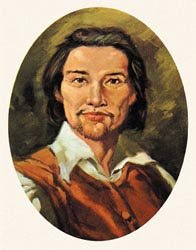

Capitão-mor, governing Pernambuco
- In office 5 March 1576 – 1580
- Monarchs: John III; Sebastian; Philip I

Deputy Governor, Capitão
- In office various–various

Personal details
- Born: c. 1510 Portugal
- Died: December 1584 Captaincy of Pernambuco, Colonial Brazil
- Spouse(s): Maria do Espírito Santo Arco Verde; Filipa de Melo
- Parent(s): Lopo de Albuquerque; Joana de Bulhão
- Relatives: Brites de Albuquerque (sister); Matias de Albuquerque (brother)

Jerónimo de Albuquerque (c. 1510–1584) was a Portuguese nobleman, military leader, and colonial administrator in the Portuguese Captaincy of Pernambuco, Brazil.

== Early life ==
Scion of the Albuquerques, Jerónimo was the son of Lopo de Albuquerque and Joana de Bulhão, a cousin of Afonso de Albuquerque and Garcia de Noronha, both Viceroys of India, and brother to Matias de Albuquerque, Viceroy of India, all descendants of King Denis of Portugal (1279–1325). He accompanied his sister Dona Brites de Albuquerque and her husband Duarte Coelho, donatário (Lord Proprietor) of Pernambuco and with them settled in the New World in 1535.

== Career ==
Jerónimo de Albuquerque was a leading and colorful personage in the early years of the Captaincy of Pernambuco. He led in many fights against the indigenous peoples. In an early battle he was blinded in one eye by an arrow. He was henceforth called "o Torto" (the Crooked). He was captured by indigenous cannibals but escaped death when the daughter of one of the principals pleaded on his behalf. He married this woman among the Tabajara peoples and she was baptized as Maria do Espírito Santo Arco Verde. They had eight children. With his marriage to this woman an alliance with the Tabajara tribe was furthered which was of great benefit to the colony.

Later he married Filipa de Melo and with her had eleven children. He fathered five additional legitimized children with both indigenous and European women. It is verified that Jerónimo fathered twenty-four children who were legitimate or legitimized and there are unverified reports that his children numbered more than 100. As a result of his known and rumored fatherings, in later generations he was often called the "Adam of Pernambuco".

He served as deputy or lieutenant governor to his sister Brites de Albuquerque when she governed, first in the absence of the donatário, Duarte Coelho, and after the first donatário’s death, during the minority of the heir Duarte Coelho de Albuquerque, second donatário of Pernambuco. He officially governed Pernambuco as capitão mor and procurador beginning on 5 March 1576, and directed the government until the year 1580. (It is reported that during a portion of his official tenure the government was directed by his father-in-law Cristóvão de Melo, perhaps due to failing health).

Jerónimo de Albuquerque built the first sugar mill in Pernambuco, the engenho Nossa Senhora da Ajuda. He died in December 1584, and was buried in the chapel on his engenho Nossa Senhora da Ajuda.
