= Quiterianópolis =

Municipality in Ceará, Brazil

- Municipality
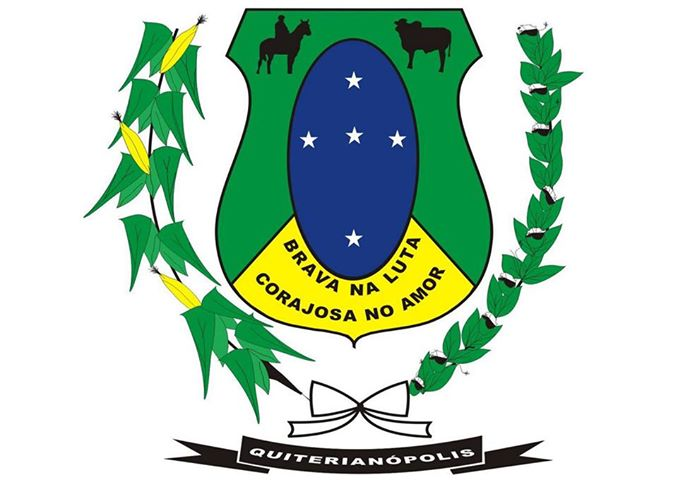
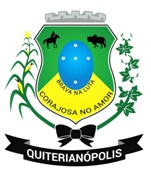
- Flag Coat of arms

- Location in Brazil
- Coordinates: 5.84278°S 40.7008°W
- Country: Brazil
- Region: Nordeste
- State: Ceará
- Mesoregion: Sertoes Cearenses

Population (2020)
  - Total: 21,166
- Time zone: UTC−3 (BRT)

Quiterianópolis is a municipality in southwestern portion of the state of Ceará near the western border in the Northeast region of Brazil. Its 2020 population (IBGE) was 21,166 inhabitants. Latitude: -5°50'32.99", Longitude: -40°42'0.78". The nearest significant city is Crateús, 75 km to the north.

== See also ==
- List of municipalities in Ceará
