= Caeté people =

Tupi people of northeastern Brazil

Caeté
Total population
- 135 (no date)

Regions with significant populations
- Brazil

Languages
- Tupi language

The Caeté (plural: Caetés) were an Indigenous people of Brazil, linguistically belonging to the Tupi people. Their descendants number around 135.

== Origin ==
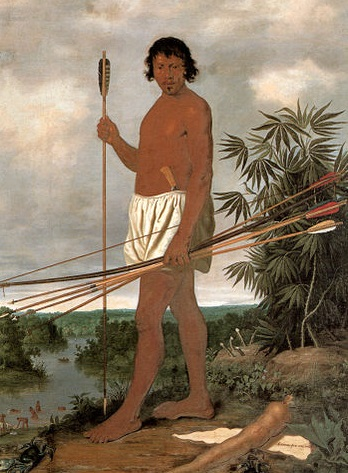
Albert Eckhout's painting of the Tupi

The Tupi people were a large group of indigenous people who populated Brazil's coast, and they were among the first natives that the Portuguese encountered when they arrived in South America. The Tupi were divided into several tribes such as the: Tupiniquim, Tupinambá, Potiguara, Tabajara, Temiminó, Tamoio, and Caeté. This tribe was estimated to contain approximately 300–2,000 people in the early 1500s, but their population eventually diminished greatly due to European diseases and slavery once the Portuguese began to settle in Brazil. The many different tribes of the Tupi people, including the Caetés, were constantly at war with each other as the Tupi were not a unified people, despite the fact that they were related linguistically. The Tupi would often attempt to capture their enemies with the intention of using them later in cannibalistic rituals. The Caeté had a reputation for being particularly violent in their battles, but they were also skilled in agriculture as they grew a variety of crops such as corn, peanuts, tobacco, squash, cotton, and much more.

== Colonial History ==
During the 16th Century, the Caeté tribe inhabited the Brazilian coast from the mouth of the São Francisco River to the island of Itamaracá, by the River Paraíba, in an area limited, in the north, by the land of the Potiguaras and, in the south, by Tupinambás. The portuguese would arrive in Brazil in 1500, and would ally the Caeté's traditional enemy the Tupinambás. The arrival of the Portuguese brought many hardships upon the Caetés, as well as the other tribes in the region, as they were now exposed to many of the European illnesses that the Portuguese brought with them, such as smallpox. In addition to being exposed to foreign diseases, the Portuguese began to enslave the indigenous people in large quantities. Those who were not enslaved were either killed or required to assimilate into European culture. Out of the Tupi tribes that were enslaved, the Caeté tribe along with the Tamoio tribe were known to resist in a violent manner.

The enslavement of the Caeté people saw its peak during the 1550s. In June 16, 1556, the Caeté peoples in Alagoas captured and cannibalized Bishop Pero Fernandes Sardinha along with the 90 sailors who shipwrecked with him. As a result, a "holy war" was declared, leading to the a military campaign campaign against the Caeté between 1556 and 1558. Under Jerónimo de Albuquerque, the Portuguese engaged in a brutal extermination of Caeté tribes between the São Francisco River and the Cabo de Santo Agostinho, with a royal decree by Catherine of Austria allowing perpetual enslavement of every person captured during the war. The town of São Miguel dos Campos would be built on top of previously Caeté lands;

The persecution did not decrease until 1570 when the first law concerning slavery in Brazil was developed. Prior to 1570, Manuel da Nóbrega, who disagreed with the way the Caeté people were being treated, made an effort to pass such a law. As a prominent Jesuit priest, Nóbrega had a great influence throughout the history of Brazil, and one of his goals was to achieve peace between the natives and the colonists. His father, Baltasar da Nóbrega, was a prominent judge of justice in Portugal. Manuel da Nóbrega took after his father by attending the University of Coimbra where he received his baccalaureate in Canon Law and philosophy. In his attempt to develop laws regarding slavery, Manuel da Nóbrega asked King John III of Portugal if he could establish an episcopacy in Brazil and King John III granted his request. During this process, one of Nóbrega's biggest opponents was the first bishop of Brazil (Pero Fernandes Sardinha), who happened to promote the idea of the "native-hunt". However, after Sardinha was captured and eaten by the Caeté people, and after Nóbrega himself received multiple threats about being killed and eaten, he changed his mind regarding the mission.

In 1587, Portuguese captain Cristóvão de Barros would undertake another campaign against the Caeté, in retaliation to the cannibalization of his father, Antonio Cardoso de Barros. During the War of Sergipe, the Caeté have also been present in the conflict.

Also in the 1580s, the Caeté would migrate north, far from their historic lands establishing in the then less settled area between the rivers Caeté and Turiaçu, between western Maranhão and the eastern part of what eventually would be the State of Grão-Pará and Rio Negro. In February 9th, 1622, the region would be formally named as Capitania de Caeté (Caeté Captainship), and Caeté villages (missões) under Jesuit influence would be reformed into towns such as Vila de Souza do Caeté in 1634 and São João Batista in 1672.

In the mid XVIII century, the Native Directory became an official post within the colonial administration. The Portuguese crown would use this post to further its integration of indigenous peoples in Brazil, while indigenous peoples would take advantage of the Directory to improve their conditions. The direrectory allowed better provision of services, payment and privileges to those who helped the crowns interests in colonial Brazil, and those leaderships, known as Principais, would be essential in the Portuguese expansion and conquest of the Amazon. While the position would only put into law in 1757, the Caetés would already have Principais, with cathechized natives Clemente Cardoso being until the 1740s the Principal of Vila de Souza, inheriting the village leadership from his parents and grandparents, but he would be replaced in 1741, when a non-Caeté, Miguel Acará, was named Principal by captain-major Felix Joaquim Souto Maior in 1741.

This leadership would be a point of contention that would lead to an event known as the Caeté Upheaval. After formal complains made by the villagers of Vila de Souza about the Jesuits, loco-tenente (local lieutenant) Manoel Ferreira da Silva de Albuquerque and an armed posse entered the village to apprehend Principal Clemente Cardoso. He would flee to a priest's home and be helped by the jesuits and some locals, who refused the authority of Miguel Acará over the settlement. Acará would be mortally wounded during the struggle. In November 24th, Francisco da Silva, ally of Manoel Ferreira, would rally the villagers from Vila de Souza to invade fellow Caeté town São João Batista to try and forcibly expel the jesuits. Armed with firearms, swords and other weapons, they would put the house of the missionaries under siege. Both the jesuits and Clemente would be expelled from the region. In 1753, the Vila de Souza would be moved to the other side of the river and become Bragança, with the Caeté Captainship also ending in August 9th of the same year as part of administrative reorganization withing the colony.

== Cannibalism ==
The Caetés, like many other indigenous people on the coast of Brazil, practiced a ritual form of cannibalism. It was a common belief among the Caetés, and the many other tribes included in the Tupi people, that the act of cannibalism and the digestion of an enemy would lead to the absorption of that enemy's strength. As they also believed that weakness could be absorbed from those they consumed, they were cautious to only absorb the essence of enemy warriors that they perceived to be of noticeable strength and courage. The Caeté people considered it an honor, even when captured, to be sacrificed for this ritual as it meant they had fought valiantly in battle and were considered the most superior warriors in their tribe. Cannibalism amongst the Caeté and other various Tupi tribes in the region decreased greatly upon the arrival of the Portuguese in the early 1500s; however, this ritual was not completely absent in the culture. For example, there was a report that the Caeté people had eaten one of the first Catholic bishops (Pedro Fernandes Sardinha), to arrive in Brazil in 1556, the Caetés were considered "enemies of the civilized world" and were chased and killed in large numbers by the Portuguese with the added help of the fully armed Tupinambá tribes. During this occurrence, the Caeté took over the ship that Sardinha was on and ate all of the passengers on board with the exception of a few who survived to report this incident. As a result, the Caetés became an even bigger target of Portuguese attacks as they were now considered to be completely savage people.

== Literary reputation ==
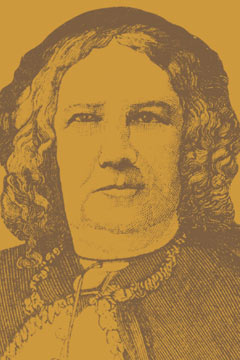
Nísia Floresta

The negative reputation of the Caeté people was so strong that the Caeté people even left a mark in the literary world. For example, in the influential epic poem Caramuru written by Santa Rita Durão in 1781, the Caeté people were presented as the enemy of Caramuru and Paraguaçu. The Caeté people were also featured in multiple works by the author Nísia Floresta. The poem A Lágrima de um Caeté which was written by Floresta was deemed to be unique due to her use of a Caeté Indian as the main character and hero. Both prior to and after this poem was written, standard Indianist literature selected heroes from peaceable Indian tribes who favored the Portuguese. Since these characteristics are not descriptive of the Caeté tribe, it is suggested that Floresta chose this Caeté man as a hero due to his persistence to continue fighting even while being oppressed. She used this character to show that the Caeté tribe demonstrated great courage while being mistreated meanwhile the Portuguese acted in a cowardly manner. In another work by Floresta, she incorporates a character from the Caeté tribe who is extremely barbaric in nature and expresses a great need to be civilized. These two traits the character possessed were well-known attributes of the Caeté tribe. Floresta uses this character from the Caeté tribe to represent her own desire for Brazil to become civilized at an equal status with Europe. The Caeté people suffered greatly from many oppressors but never went down without a fight. Floresta's poems used the Caeté people in a way most had never seen them and highlighted their fierceness and independence.

== See Also ==
- Tupinambá people
