= Canal de Santa Cruz =

Salt water channel in Northeastern Brazil

Coordinates: 7°49′S 34°50′W

Canal de Santa Cruz (Santa Cruz Channel) is a U-shaped salt water channel in Northeastern Brazil adjacent to the Atlantic Ocean that separates the island of Itamaracá from the South American continent. It is located 50 km north of the city of Recife in state of Pernambuco, Brazil (Lat. 7 ° 49 ' S, . Long 34 º 50' W).
