= Brites de Albuquerque =

Portuguese colonial administrator in Brazil

2nd and 4th Governor of Pernambuco
- In office 1553–1560
- Monarchs: Dom João III; Sebastian of Portugal
- Lieutenant: Jeronimo de Albuquerque
- Preceded by: Duarte Coelho
- Succeeded by: Duarte Coelho de Albuquerque
- In office 1572–1584
- Monarchs: Sebastian of Portugal; Henry, King of Portugal; Philip I
- Lieutenant: Jeronimo de Albuquerque
- Preceded by: Duarte Coelho de Albuquerque
- Succeeded by: Jeronimo de Albuquerque

Personal details
- Born: C. 1507 Kingdom of Portugal
- Died: c. 1584 Captaincy of Pernambuco, Colonial Brazil
- Spouse: Duarte Coelho (before 1535)
- Parent(s): Lopo de Albuquerque; Joana de Bulhão
- Relatives: Jeronimo de Albuquerque (brother)

Brites de Albuquerque, a.k.a. Beatriz de Albuquerque, (c. 1507–1584) was a noble, a colonial administrator in the Portuguese colony of Brazil. She was the first woman to serve as governor in a colony in the New World.

== Biography ==
Scion of the Albuquerques Dona Brites was daughter of Lopo de Albuquerque and Joana de Bulhão. a cousin of Afonso de Albuquerque and Garcia de Noronha both viceroys of India, and sister to Matias de Albuquerque, viceroy of India, all descendants of King Dom Dinis (1279–1325). She married Duarte Coelho donatario (Lord Proprietor) of Pernambuco and with him settled in the New World in 1535. Three children are known, Duarte Coelho de Albuquerque, second donatario, Jorge de Albuquerque Coelho, Third Donatario, and Inês de Moura.

Dona Brites, assisted by her brother Jeronimo, governed Pernambuco three or four times, first during her husbands trip to Portugal in 1540–1541, again beginning during his final trip to Portugal in 1553, and continuing as governor and administrator of the estate during the minority and absence of their son Duarte, the heir, until 1560, again in 1572 (and 1573) as representative of her son Duarte, and probably continuously until 1582 but possibly once again from an unknown date until her death sometime before 1584.

Political offices
Preceded by Duarte Coelho	Governor of Pernambuco; 1553–1560	Succeeded by Duarte Coelho de Albuquerque
Preceded by Duarte Coelho de Albuquerque	Governor of Pernambuco; 1572–1584	Succeeded by Jeronimo de Albuquerque
