= Duarte Coelho =

Portuguese colonial administsrator

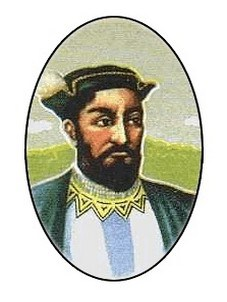
- Duarte Coelho, Proprietor of Pernambuco

Proprietor of the Captaincy of Pernambuco
- In office 1534–1553
- Monarch: John III
- Preceded by: Office created
- Succeeded by: Duarte Coelho de Albuquerque

First Governor of Pernambuco
- In office 1535–1553
- Preceded by: Office created
- Succeeded by: Brites de Albuquerque

Personal details
- Born: Duarte Coelho Pereira c. 1485 Porto, Portugal
- Died: c. 1553 Portugal
- Citizenship: Portuguese
- Spouse: Dona Brites de Albuquerque
- Children: Duarte Coelho de Albuquerque; Jorge de Albuquerque Coelho; Inês
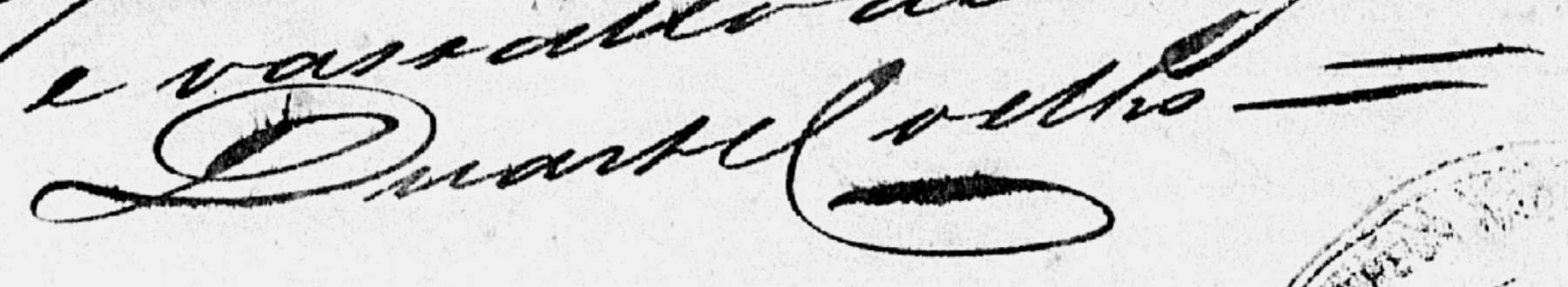
- Signature

Military service
- Allegiance: Portuguese Empire
- Rank: Capitão-mor

Duarte Coelho Pereira (c. 1485 – c. 1553) was a nobleman, military leader, and colonial administrator in the Portuguese colony of Brazil. He was the first Donatario (Lord Proprietor) of the captaincy of Pernambuco and founder of Olinda.

== Early life ==
The birth and childhood of Duarte Coelho Pereira are obscured from history. His father's name was Gonçalo Coelho, but it is not clear which of six men named Gonçalo Coelho may have sired Duarte. Often biographers have assigned his parentage to either the escrivão da fazenda real or the fourth senhor of Felgueiras; however, archival and heraldic evidence supports neither of these men nor points conclusively to any of the four other prominent men named Gonçalo Coelho in this period. That he was not noble at birth is suggested in the fact that coeval writers, some of whom would have known his parentage, are silent as to Duarte Coelho's ancestry. It was common in this era for genealogies to be “adjusted” for famous men; thus, existing genealogies are not conclusive. Likewise, it is also unlikely that there is any substance to the story that Coelho sailed as a boy with his father to Brazil in 1503.

== Biography ==
In 1509, he went to India in the fleet of D. Fernando Coutinho, where he served the crown for about 20 years. During that time, he played an important role in the taking of Portuguese Malacca, he was ambassador to Siam, visited China, India, Vietnam, Indonesia, and played an important role during the capture of Bintan. In 1526, he sent a fleet of brigantines to Sunda Kelapa to fulfill the Luso-Sundanese treaty, however his fleet was destroyed by Fatahillah, a naval commander from Cirebon before they could make contact with Pakuan Pajajaran.

After his return from Asia in 1530, King João put his diplomatic experience to use on a mission to France when Dr. Lourenço Garcês died shortly after his appointment to the French court. In 1531, Duarte Coelho was Capitão-mor of the annual armada to Elmina to take supplies and bring back gold. Returning in 1532, he met with ships returning from India and escorted them back to Portugal. Again in 1532, he patrolled the Malagueta coast and erected fortifications for the crown. Again in 1533, he was dispatched to the Azores to meet and escort the armada returning from India.

While in Asia, Duarte Coelho had succeeded in accumulating a substantial fortune; moreover, he had served under Jorge de Albuquerque, twice captain of Malacca, and a member of the Albuquerque family, the same extended family that included Afonso de Albuquerque, Duke of Goa. Duarte married Dona Brites de Albuquerque, niece of Jorge de Albuquerque.

For his service, he received, on 10 March 1534, the grant of 60 leagues of coastline in Brazil, in the current states of Pernambuco and Alagoas, the captaincy of Pernambuco, or New Lusitania. The grant extended from the Southern banks of the Rio Igaraçu (adjacent to the island of Ilha de Itamaracá), south to the São Francisco River. He arrived in Pernambuco on 9 March 1535, accompanied by his wife, Dona Brites de Albuquerque, her brother Jerónimo de Albuquerque, other relatives, and families of northern Portugal. He founded the village of Igaraçu and fought battles with the Indigenous tribes. He built the Church of Santos Cosme e Damião, the first in Brazil. Then, giving the administration of the village to Afonso Gonçalves, his comrade in arms from Asia, Duarte Coelho moved Southward to establish the village of Olinda.

== Death and legacy ==
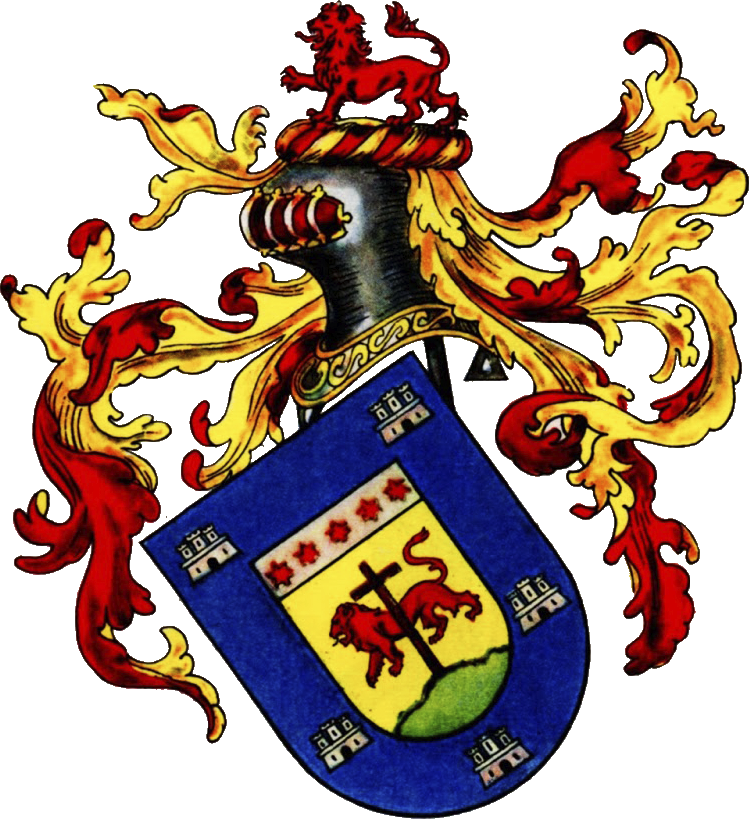
Coat of arms of Duarte Coelho

In 1553, Duarte died in Portugal, having returned there to petition the King, and having left the governance of Pernambuco with his wife, Dona Brites, assisted by her brother, Jerónimo de Albuquerque. During his twenty years as the Lord Proprietor, he had fought many battles with the indigenous tribes, established the colony as the premier source of sugar for most of Europe, begun the import of Africans as slaves for the sugar plantations, explored much of the Rio São Francisco, and established Pernambuco as the most successful captaincy in Brazil in the early colonial period. Three of his descendants were Lord-Proprietors after Duarte Coelho; however, all three were mostly absent from Pernambuco.

His oldest son, Duarte Coelho de Albuquerque, Second Lord Proprietor, did govern in Pernambuco in the 1560s, and he and his brother, Jorge Albuquerque Coelho (the future Third Lord Proprietor), fought with their uncle Jerónimo de Albuquerque in the conquest of Cabo. However, both returned to Portugal and in 1578, both accompanied Dom Sebastião on his ill-fated expedition to North Africa, where both were captured, imprisoned, ransomed, and subsequently, Duarte died. Jorge never returned to Pernambuco. The Fourth and last Lord Proprietor, Duarte de Albuquerque Coelho, was a minor when he inherited, and his proprietorship was interrupted by the Dutch incursion into Northeast Brazil beginning in 1630.
