= Tabajara =

Tupi people of northeasterrn Brazil

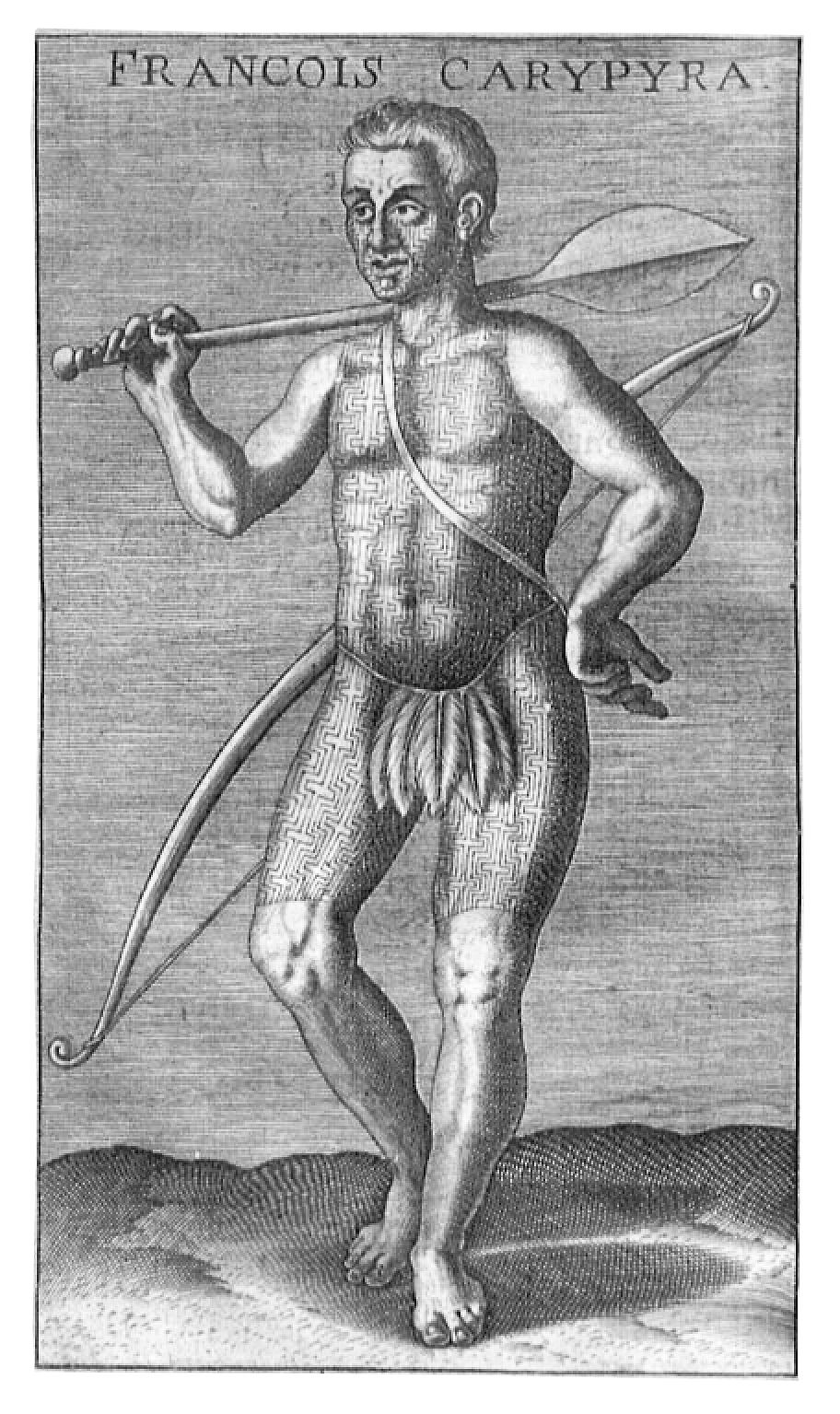
- A Tabajara warrior, named François Carypyra. Engraving by Claude d'Abbeville, 1614

Total population
- 1,000 (2017)

Regions with significant populations
- Brazil (Ceará, Paraíba, Piauí)

Languages
- Portuguese, Tupi, French (17th century)

Related ethnic groups
- Tupi

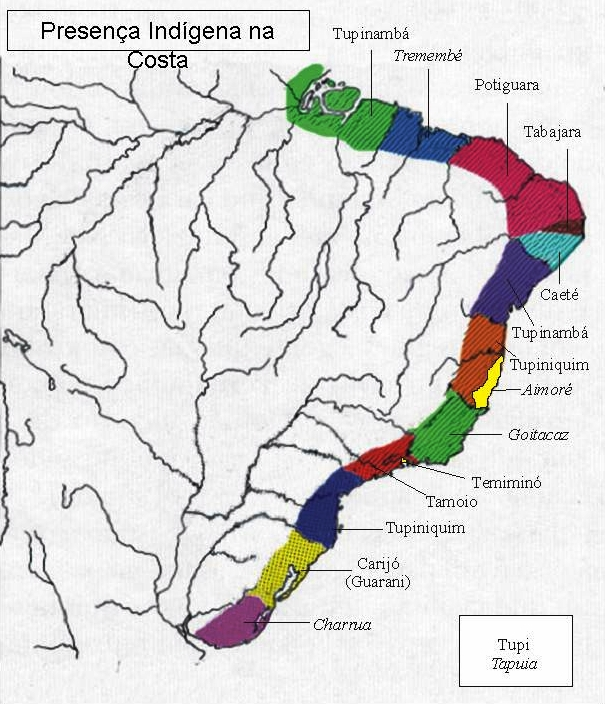
Distribution of indigenous groups on the Brazilian coast in the 16th century

The Tabajara (Portuguese pronunciation: [tabaˈʒaɾɐ]; plural: Tabajaras) are an Indigenous people of Brazil who lived on the easternmost portion of the Atlantic coast of northeast Brazil in the period before and during Portuguese colonization. Their territory extended from Ilha de Itamaracá to the mouth of the Paraíba River, as well as some territories in Piauí. Nowadays, they live in the states of Ceará, Paraíba and Piauí. The name means 'lord of the village' from Tupi-Guarani taba 'village', and jara 'lord'.

During the colonial period, populations of Indians, Tabajara among them, were decimated by being slaughtered by the colonists, driven inland, enslaved, dying of European-introduced diseases and intermarrying.

They currently live in the regions of Poranga, Monsenhor Tabosa, Tamboril, Crateús and Quiterianópolis and in the backcountry of Ceará.

== History ==
The Tabajaras were aliens of the French doing their kidnapping of the population of Maranhão Island (now the city and island of São Luis) in 1612–1615.
