= Lagarto =

Lagarto (Spanish and Portuguese for 'lizard') or Lagartos may refer to:

== Places ==
- Lagarto, Sergipe, a city in Sergipe state of Brazil
- Lagartos, a municipality located in the province of Palencia, Castile and León, Spain
- Lagarto River, Costa Rica
- Lagarto (crater), Mars

== People ==
- António Lagarto, Portuguese set and costume designer and artist
- Jacob Lagarto, seventeenth century South-American rabbi and Talmudist
- Lúcio Rodrigues (born 1980), Brazilian jiu-jitsu black belt and MMA fighter nicknamed "Lagarto"
- Lagarto (footballer) (1896-unknown), Severino Franco da Silva, Brazilian footballer

== Other uses ==
- USS Lagarto (SS-371), US World War II submarine
- Operation Lagarto, a failed Australian Second World War commando operation in Japanese-held Timor
- Macroscincus, a species of lizard otherwise known as lagarto
- Lagarto Futebol Clube, a Brazilian football club
- Lagartos FC, a Guinea-Bissauan football club
- El Lagarto, the hydroplane which won the APBA Gold Cup from 1933 to 1935

== See also ==
- Pedro de Lagarto (c. 1465-1543), Spanish singer and composer
- Lagartos de Tabasco, a Mexican football club
