= Lisbon Theatre and Film School =

Film school

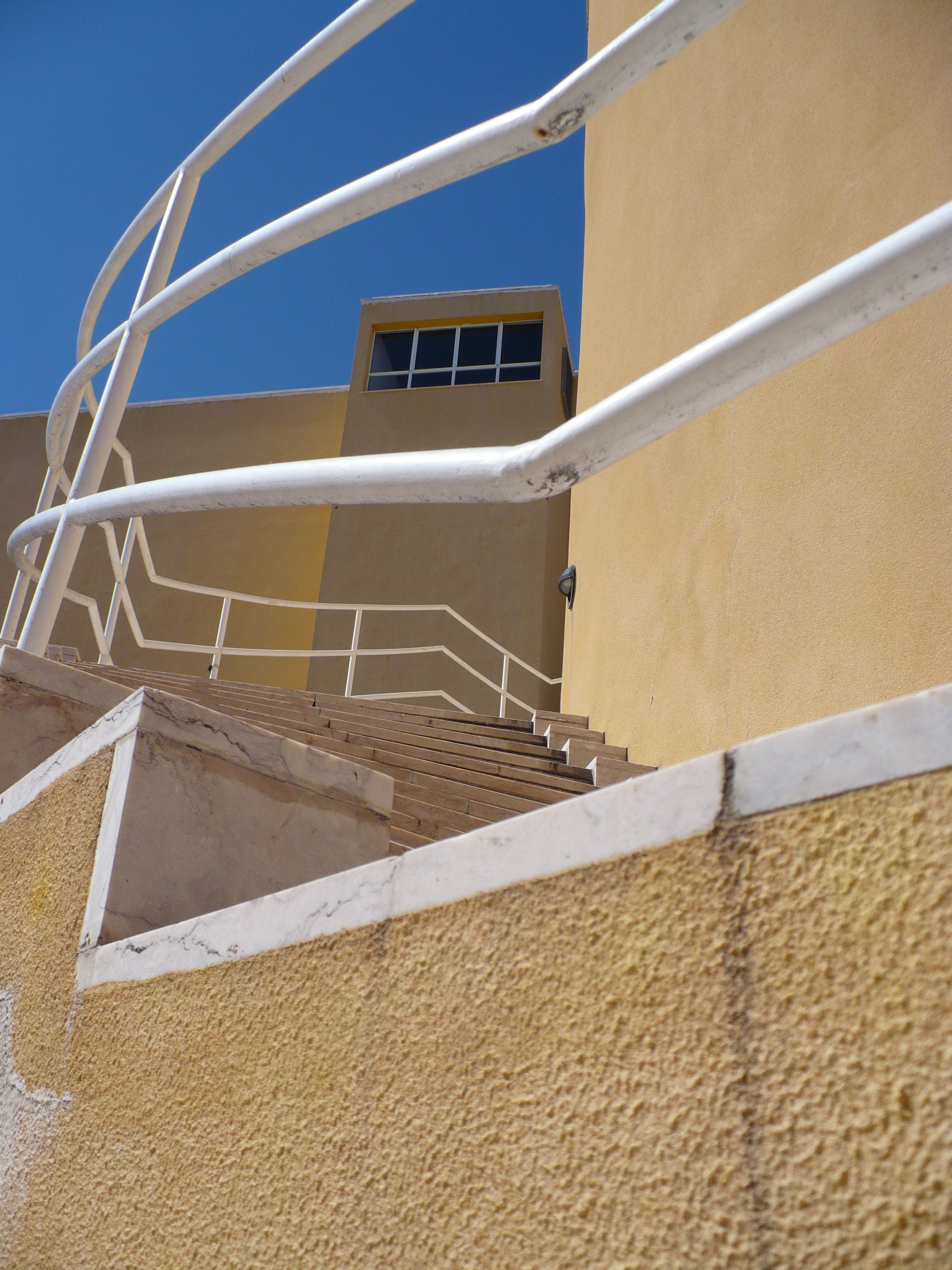
The building of the Lisbon Theatre and Film School.

The Lisbon Theatre and Film School (Escola Superior de Teatro e Cinema) of the Polytechnic Institute of Lisbon inherited the function of the National Conservatoire, founded by Almeida Garrett, in 1836, and of teaching Film, introduced in the same establishment since 1971. The main goal of the Lisbon Theatre and Film School is training in the fields of Theatre and Cinema. Sometimes it is still referred to by its former designation "Conservatório Nacional". It is a public institution of higher education created in Lisbon but now located in Amadora, Portugal.

== History ==
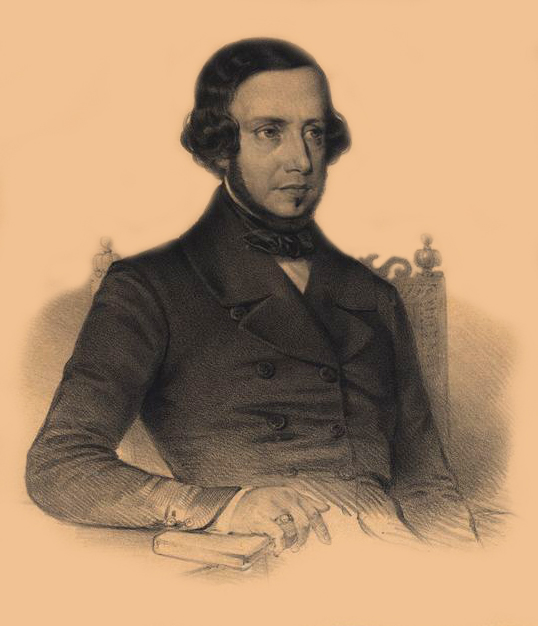
Almeida Garrett by Pedro Augusto Guglielmi.

The Lisbon Theatre and Film School was set up in Lisbon by Decree-Law nr. 310/83, dated July 1 (1983). The object of this legal document was to reconvert the National Conservatoire (Conservatório Nacional), the establishment of artistic education, and the setting up of several new establishments offering degrees in the same artistic areas as the Conservatório, among which this school, specifically directed at theatre and film education.

Theatre Education had a long tradition in the National Conservatoire: it went back to the date of its creation in 1836, by Decree of Queen Maria II, in the scope of a Plan for the foundation and organisation of a National Theatre proposed by João Baptista de Almeida Garrett, then still called Conservatório Geral de Arte Dramática and formed by three Schools: Escola Dramática ou de Declamação for drama education, Escola de Música for music education (integrating the former Conservatório de Música, set up in Casa Pia by Decree of 1835) and Escola de Dança, Mímica e Ginástica Especial for dance, mime arts and especial gymnastics education.

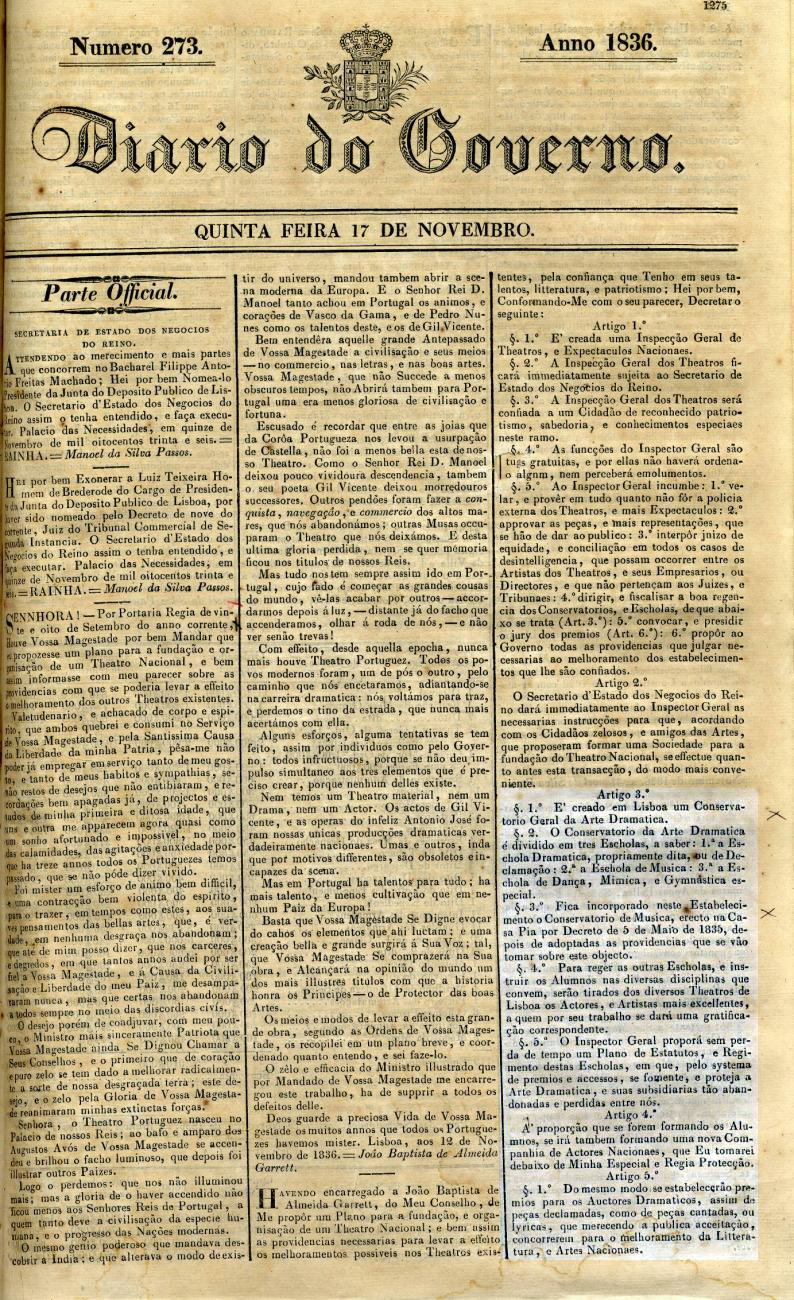
Journal of Laws (Diário do Governo) of November 17th, 1836.

By later reforms, the name of the CNational Conservatoire was changed, first to Conservatório Real de Lisboa and then, already under the new republican regime, to Conservatório Nacional, the name of the Escola Dramática ou de Declamação being altered to Escola de Arte de Representar.

On July 4, 1914, the School of Art of Acting (Escola de Arte de Representar) was for the first time granted management autonomy.

By Decree dated May 19, 1914, the scenography and setting design degree was set up in this school (to be taught “in the big paintings room of the National Theatre Almeida Garrett which, functioning under the Escola de Arte de Representar”, would exclusively “be at the service andpractices of the corresponding teacher”); by Decree of August 6, 1914, the costume designer degree was also set up.

As for Film Education, the corresponding degree was only set up in National Conservatoire after 1971, on a pedagogic experimental basis, in the scope of the reform process undertaken by Madalena Perdigão, in the time of Minister Veiga Simão.

By that time, the Pilot School for the Formation of Film Professionals (Escola Piloto para a Formação de Profissionais de Cinema) was created and its first degree initiated in 1973. From the beginning, a deep concern of this school has been to complement the technical knowledge necessary to cinema-linked professions with a more artistic component.

The degree being offered today by the Department of Film of the Lisbon Theatre and Film School has gone through an evolution since 1973 but its philosophy is still the same as that of the first degree which, it should be stressed, was very much of a pioneer in Portuguese public higher education.

By governmental Decree nr. 46/85, of November 22 (1985), the Lisbon Theatre and Film School - that had so far been under the Directorate General of Higher Education (Direcção-Geral do Ensino Superior) and, since 1983, managed by an Organisation Committee formed by Professors Jorge Synek Listopad, President, and José Bogalheiro, member – was integrated in the Polytechnic Institute of Lisbon (IPL), a public polytechnic higher education establishment created by Decree-Law nr. 513-T/79, of December 26 (1979).

The Lisbon Theatre and Film School became then an organic unit of the Polytechnic Institute of Lisbon, still in a process of internal organisation by the mentioned Committee until the publication of its Statutes in Journal of Laws (Diário da República), 2nd series, nr. 15, of January 18, 1995.

When totally new premises were built in Amadora, within the greater Lisbon area, for the Lisbon Theatre and Film School(the first building ever constructed in Portugal specifically to host a public artistic higher education establishment), it was finally possible to move from the old Caetanos' Convent (Convento dos Caetanos), in Lisbon, where Almeida Garrett´s Conservatório Geral de Arte Dramática had provisionally functioned, to modern premises designed to have adequate teaching rooms, studios, performing areas, library and cafeteria, all of which offer the best working conditions for its students.

The bi-departmental structure of the School, a historical heritage from the previous schools of Theatre and of Film of the National Conservatoire, led to a certain pedagogic-scientific autonomy granted to the two Departments, according to the Statutes.

The Lisbon Theatre and Film School has steadily been asserting itself as a reference school both at national and international level, and it has been integrated in relevant international organisations dealing not only with the specific areas concerned, like the International Theatre Institute (ITI), the CILECT – Centre International de Liaison des Écoles de Cinema et de Telévision, but also with Arts in general, which is the case of ELIA – European League of Institutes of the Arts.

This international cooperation concern also led to efforts made to strengthen the School´s active participation in teacher and student intercourse programmes, within specific programmes, like the Socrates/Erasmus and the Leonardo da Vinci, as well as bilateral agreements with Universities of Latin America (Brazil, Argentina, Mexico).

The objectives of the Lisbon Theatre and Film School, according to its Statutes, are: Training of highly qualified professionals; research activities; artistic experiments and production; launching or participation in development projects; community involvement.

To consistently fulfil these objectives, the School has adjusted its educational provision to the Bologne Process, its two Departments offering first and second level Degrees (Graduation and Master); it set up a Research Centre which is developing projects in partnership with a similar Centre in University of Algarve; it participates in educational development programmes at local level, as for instance the programme for curriculum improvement activities in public basic schools in the Amadora municipality, and annually produces and organises, in its own premises as well as in Theatres, Museums, Cinemas and other public spaces, numbers of performances and exhibitions of its students´ dramatic and cinema practical works, attendance to all events being free to the community.

== Courses ==
- Graduation in Theatre: Acting, Set & Costume Design, Production Management.
- Graduation in Cinema: Screenwriting, Production, Direction, Cinematography, Sound, Editing.
- Master in Theatre: Performative Arts (Writing for the Stage, Acting, Theatre of Movement, Theatre-Music), Set & Costume Design, Directing, Production Management, Theatre & Community.
- Master in Film Project Development: Dramaturgy and Directing, Cinematic Narrative, Post-Production Technology.

== The Students ==
Among students who have studied at the Lisbon Theatre and Film School are name like:

=== Theatre ===
- Alexandra Lencastre
- André e. Teodósio
- Catarina Wallenstein
- Diogo Infante
- Elmano Sancho
- Eunice Muñoz
- Hana Sofia Lopes
- Nuno Lopes
- Rita Blanco
- Ruy de Carvalho
- Sílvia Alberto
- Teresa Tavares

=== Film ===
- David Fonseca
- Edgar Pêra
- Joaquim Leitão
- Joaquim Sapinho
- João Botelho
- João Pedro Rodrigues
- João Salaviza
- Manuel Mozos
- Manuela Viegas
- Marco Martins
- Miguel Gomes
- Pedro Costa
- Rui Reininho
- Vítor Gonçalves
- Susana de Sousa Dias

== Teaching Staff ==
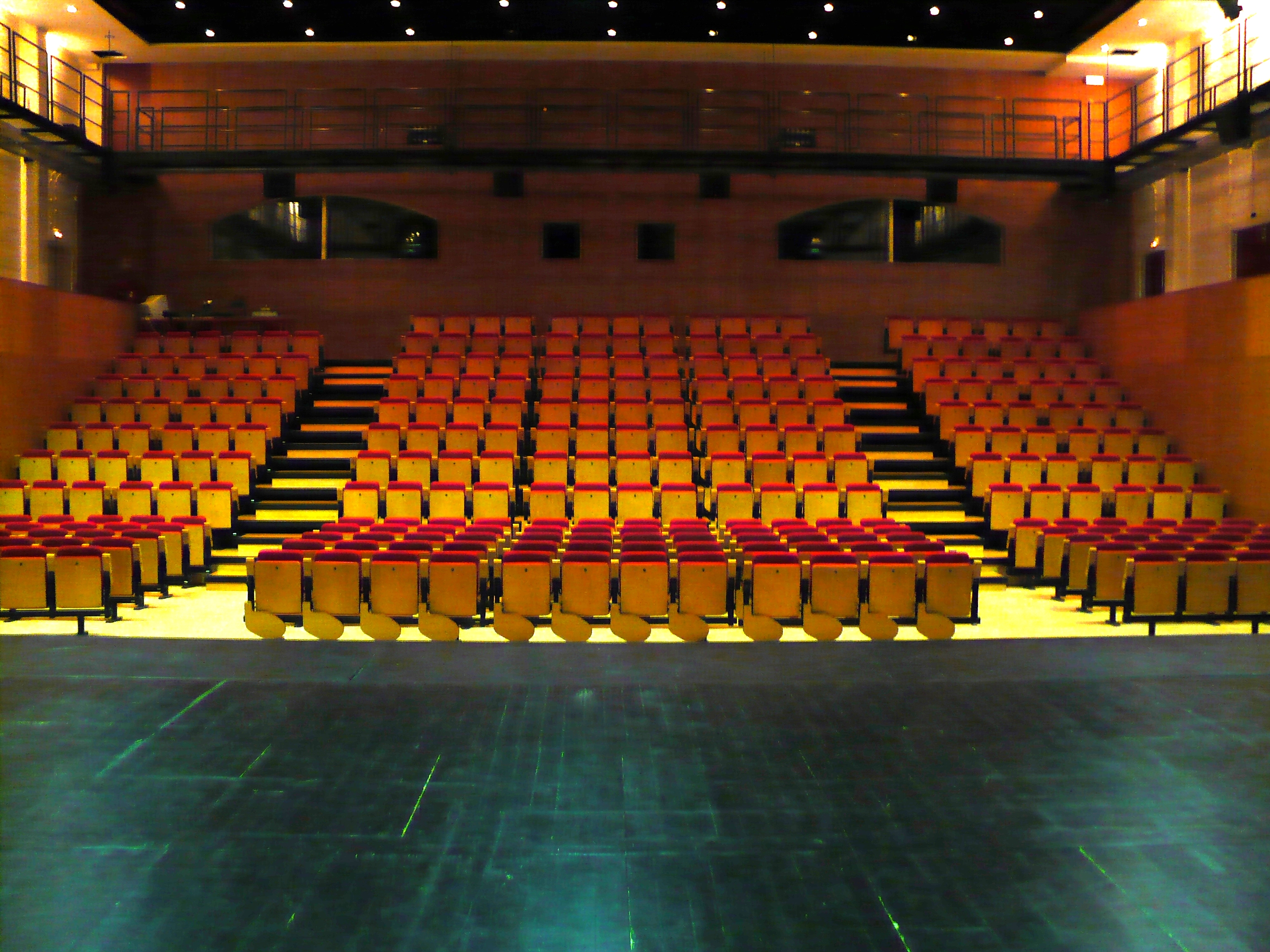
Big Auditorium.

Among the teachers who taught at the Lisbon Theatre and Film School are name like:

=== Theatre ===
- Anna Paula
- António Casimiro
- Glória de Matos
- Guilherme Filipe
- João Mota
- Jorge Listopad
- José Carlos Barros
- José Peixoto
- Margarida de Abreu
- Mário Barradas
- Rogério de Carvalho
- Rui Mendes

=== Film ===
In the past:

- António Reis
- Alberto Seixas Santos
- Paulo Rocha
- Fernando Lopes

In the present:

- Vítor Gonçalves
- Joaquim Sapinho
- Manuela Viegas

== The Presidents / Directors ==
As Lisbon Theatre and Film School (Escola Superior de Teatro e Cinema):

- 2012-... - António Lagarto
- 2011 - Carlos J. Pessoa
- 2007-2010 - Filipe Oliveira
- 2004-2006 - Paulo Morais Alexandre
- 2001-2003 - Daniel del-Negro
- 1998-2000 - João Mota
- 1995-1997 - Filipe Oliveira (Conselho Diretivo)
- 1983-1995 - Jorge Listopad and José Bogalheiro

As Conservatoire (Conservatório):

- 1978-1983 - Luís Casanovas, Viegas Tavares and Luís Oliveira Nunes
- 1972-1978 - Lúcio Mendes
- 1938-1971 - Manuel Ivo Cruz
- 1930-1937 - Júlio Dantas
- 1918-1938 - Vianna da Motta
- 1898-1917 - Eduardo Schwalbach Lucci
- 1878-1898 - Luís Augusto Palmeirim
- 1870-1878 - Duarte de Sá
- 1848-1869 - Joaquim Pedro Quintela
- 1842-1848 - António Pereira dos Reis and José Trasimundo Mascarenhas Barreto
- 1841-1842 - Joaquim Larcher
- 1836-1841 - Almeida Garrett

== Management Bodies ==
(2012-2014)

- President - António Lagarto
- Director of the Department of Theatre - Álvaro Correia
- Director of the Department of Film - José Bogalheiro
- President of Technical & Scientific Council - João Maria Mendes
- President of the Pedagogical Council - Francisco Salgado
- President of the Council of Representatives - Filipe Oliveira

== International relations ==
The Lisbon Theatre and Film School is affiliated to:

- the ITI - International Theatre Institute / UNESCO Chair,
- the ELIA – European League of Institutes of the Arts
- the CILECT – Centre International de Liaison des Écoles de Cinéma et Télévision.
