= Aljona Surzhikova =

Estonian documentary director

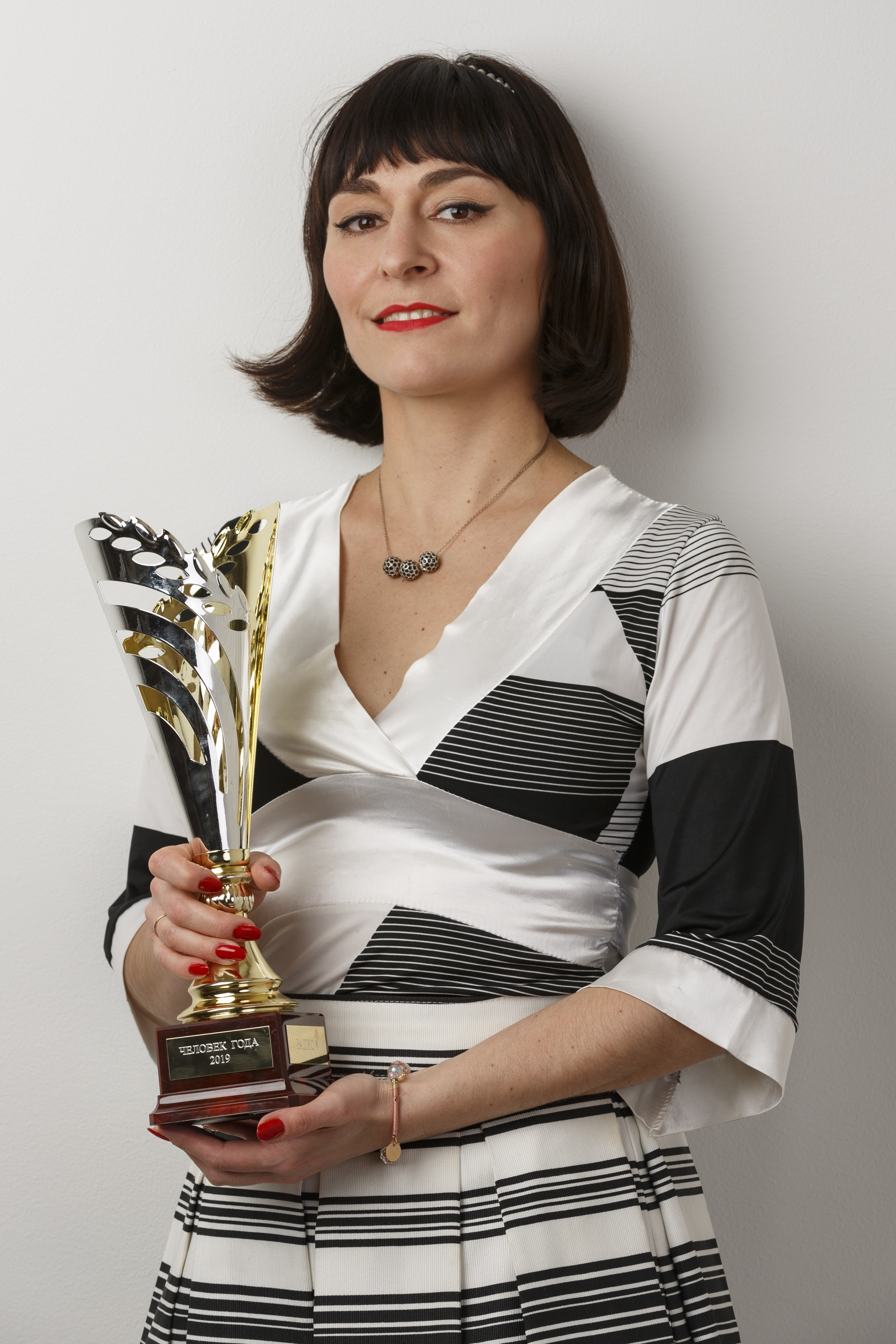
- Born: Tallinn, then part of Estonian SSR, Soviet Union
- Occupations: Director, writer, editor, producer
- Years active: 2007 - present

Aljona Surzhikova (Russian: Алена Суржикова, Estonian: Aljona Suržikova) is an Estonian director and writer. She is best known for her work on the documentary films Not my Land and Waiting for a Miracle.

== Life and career ==
Aljona was born in Tallinn. She studied television directing at Tallinn University and documentary making at Saint Petersburg State University for Film Industry and Television.

In 2014, Surzhikova won the Best Young Director award from Estonian Cultural Endowment for the film, Not My Land. In 2019, she received the Person of the Year award from Raadio 4 and her TV show project, Stories of Success, was shown on ETV. She also received a special mention at the Jihlava International Documentary Film Festival for her documentary film, Waiting for a Miracle.

== Filmography ==
Year	Title	Contribution	Note
2003	Silhouette of the Master	Director	Estonian - original title: Meistri siluett
2008	Generation 0	Writer/director/editor/cinematographer	Estonian - original title: Generatsioon 0
2009	Miss Robinson	Director/editor/producer	
2010	Portrait of a Working Man	Writer/director	Estonian - original title: Töölise portree
2011	Singing Nadezhda	Writer/director/editor	Estonian - original title: Laulev Nadežda
2011	Men	Writer/director/producer	Estonian - original title: Mehed
2013	Not My Land	Director/editor	
2014	The Bachelor and Volga	Writer/director	Estonian - original title: Poissmees ja Volga
2016	The Search of the Path. Robert Kasemagi	Director	Estonian - original title: Tee otsing. Robert Kasemägi
2016	Actual Narva	Director	Estonian - original title: Aktuaalne Narva
2017	Paradise Behind the Fence	Writer/director	Estonian - original title: Lumi punasel lagedal
2017	Kerro 40	Director	
2018	Waiting For A Miracle	Director/editor/cinematographer	Estonian - original title: Juured: Oodates imet
2019	The Stories of Success	Writer/director	
