= Margarida de Abreu =

Portuguese choreographer

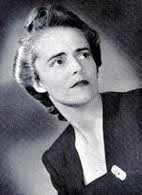
- Margarida de Abreu in 1940s
- Born: November 26, 1915; Lisbon, Portugal
- Died: September 29, 2006; Lisbon, Portugal
- Occupation: Choreographer
- Years active: 1937-1988
- Known for: Founding classical ballet in Portugal
- Notable work: Manifesto (1946), Círculo de Inicição Coreográfica (1946)

Margarida de Abreu (Lisbon, 26 November 1915 – Lisbon, 29 September 2006) was a Portuguese choreographer. She is identified with the foundation of the classical ballet in Portugal.

== Biography ==
In 1932, de Abreu travelled to Geneva, Switzerland, where she frequented the Institut Jacques Dalcroze. She continued studying dance in the Deutsche Tanz Schule, Berlin, and in the Hellerau Laxenburg Schule, Vienna. She was trained as a dance teacher in Sadler's Wells, today the Royal Ballet School, between 1937 and 1938.

Margarida de Abreu returned to Portugal in 1939 to teach dance at the Portuguese National Conservatory, now called the Lisbon Theatre and Film School (Escola Superior de Teatro e Cinema). She lectured there until she retired in 1986.

In 1946, she wrote her "Manifesto" (a manifest). In the text, she defines dance as a "Plastic of actitude, expression of the mask, movement's harmony, contrapoint of gesture, environment suggestion." and ballet as "An intimate and almost orchestral association between dance, music, spirit and decoration ". She also announces the beginning works of Círculo de Inicição Coreográfica (CIC) (literally: circle of choreography initiation) in her manifesto. In the same year of the book's release, de Abreu began work on the CIC.

de Abreu's CIC was founded with three main objectives: to disclose the classical ballet throw performances, collaboration in Opera seasons and performers training. Between 1946 and 1960 she travels with CIC collaborating in Teatro Nacional de São Carlos (TNSC) Opera seasons (1947/49/50) and in Coliseu dos Recreios (CR) (1952/3/4/5).

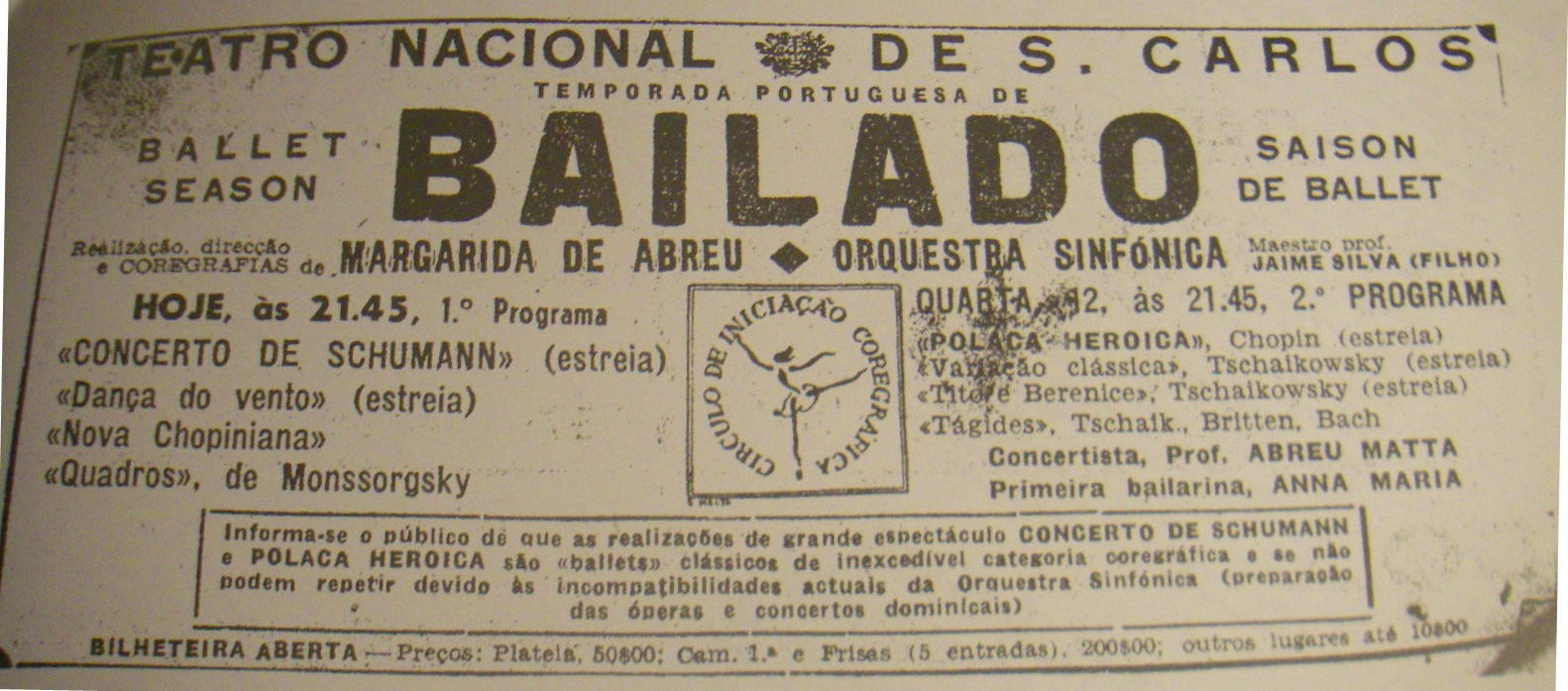
Ticket of a CIC ballet performance at TNSC, 1949

In 1960, de Abreu was invited to remodel and to co-direct Grupo de Bailados Verde Gaio along with her ex-student Fernando Lima. She did this until 1978. Between 1964 and 1972, she integrated the Centro de Estudos de Bailado (CEB) of Instituto de Alta Cultura (vulgo TNSC's ballet school), as its choreographer. In 1986, de Abreu retired from the National Conservatory and created the "Grupo Studium Margarida de Abreu", with a headquarters in Lisbon. In 1988, she collaborated as a choreographer in Manoel de Oliveira picture "Os Canibais" and in 1992, again as choreographer, in António-Pedro Vasconcelos picture "Aqui D'El Rei!". de Abreu died on September 29, 2006, in Lisbon.

== Tributes ==
In 1979, she received the "Ordem de Instrução Pública", an honorable mention from Portuguese president for remarkable achievements of public interest in instruction, and the "Casa de Imprensa" trophy. In 1980, de Abreu was given with the "Almeida Garrett Medal", at TNSC. In 1988, she received the newspaper "Sete Trophy" and two years following, she received the "Artistic Merit Medal" from the Brazilian Council of Dance. On October 25, 2005, de Abreu received the Editorial Verbo's "Annualia Prize" from the Portuguese president, Jorge Sampaio, at Centro Cultural de Belém, Lisbon.
