= Ilha de Itamaracá =

Island and municipality in Pernambuco, Northeast, Brazil

Ilha de Itamaracá Município de Ilha de Itamaracá
- Municipality
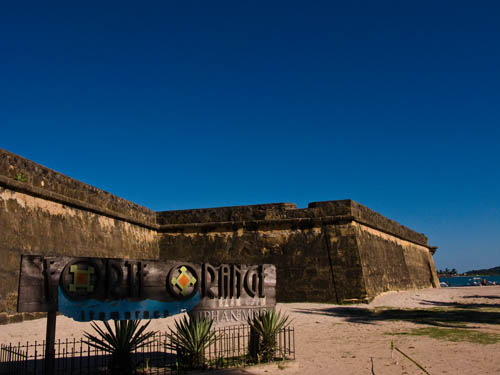
- Forte Orange, Ilha de Itamaracá, Pernambuco, Brasil

- Flag Coat of arms
- Nicknames: "Beleza Natural" "Capital da Ciranda
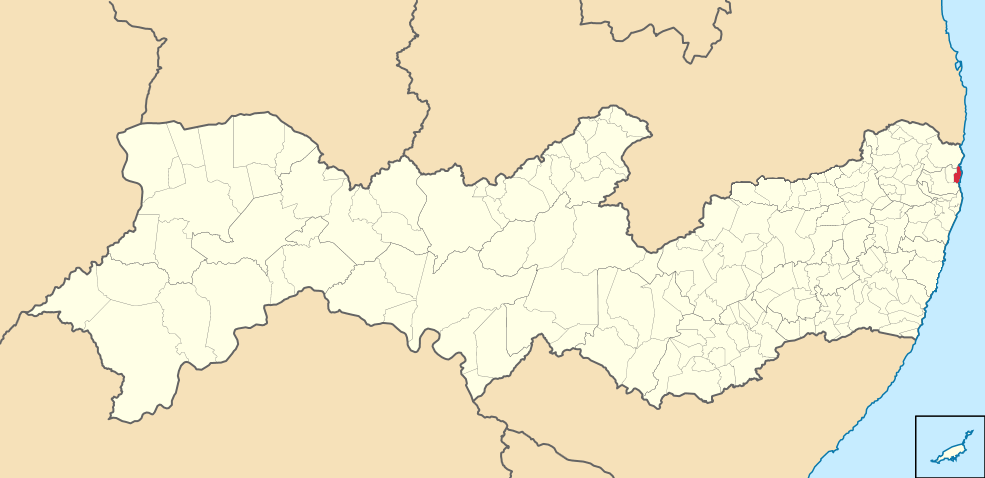
- Location of Ilha de Itamaracá in Pernambuco

- Location of Ilha de Itamaracá in Brazil
- Coordinates: 07°44′50″S 34°49′40″W
- Country: Brazil
- Region: Northeast
- State: Pernambuco
- Founded: December 31, 1958

Government
  - Mayor: Paulo Batista (PTB, 2013-2016)

Area
  - Total: 66.68 km^{2} (25.75 sq mi)
- Elevation: 30 m (98 ft)

Population (2022 Census)
  - Total: 24,540
  - Density: 368.0/km^{2} (953.2/sq mi)
- Demonym: Itamaracaense
- Time zone: UTC−3 (BRT)
- Website: ilhadeitamaraca.pe.gov.br

Itamaracá Island
Native name: Ilha de Itamaracá
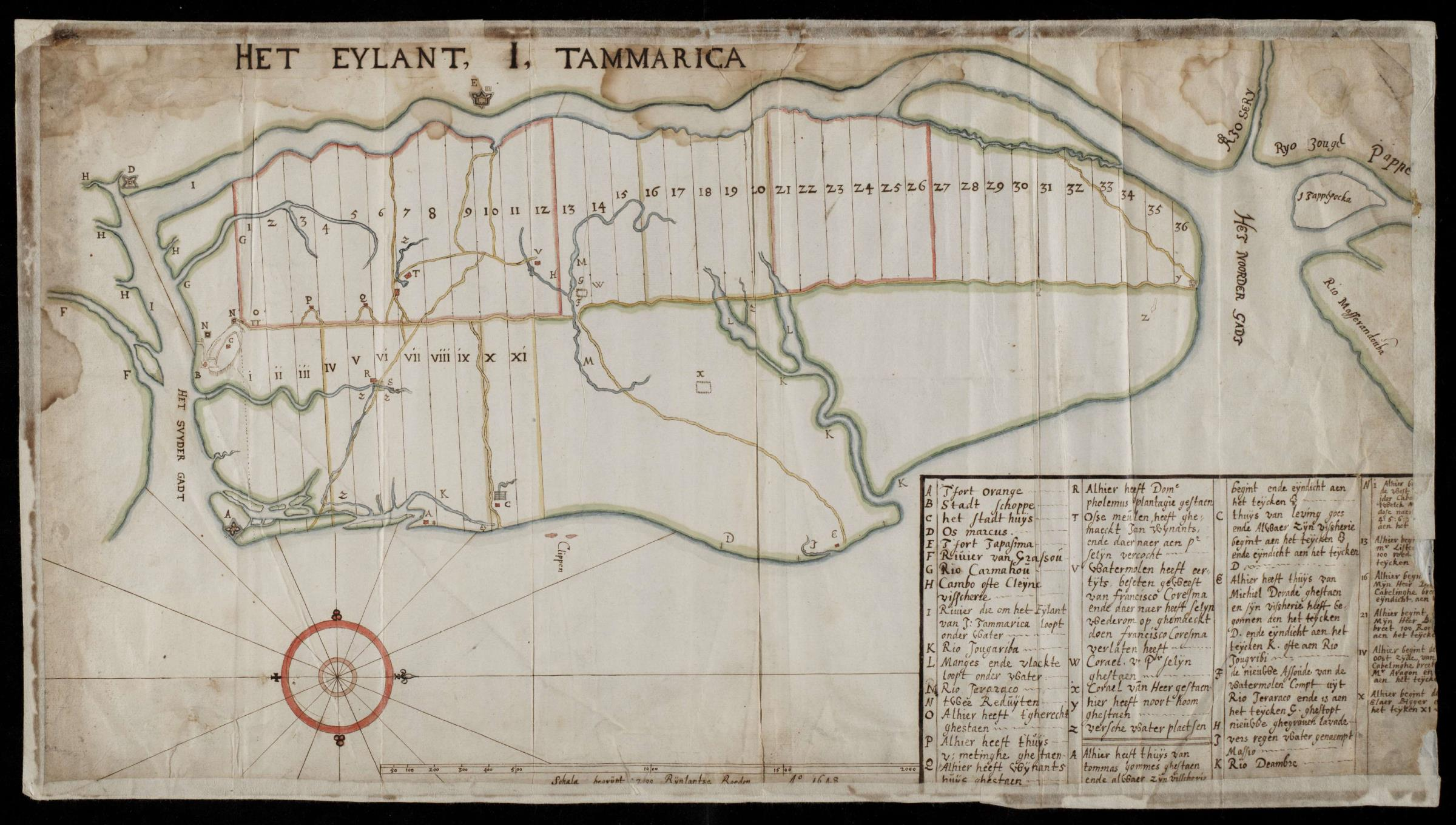
- Dutch map of Itamaracá Island, 1648

Geography
- Location: Atlantic Ocean

Administration
- Brazil
- State: Pernambuco
- Municipality: Itamaracá

Ilha de Itamaracá (Central northeastern portuguese pronunciation: [ˈijɐ di itɐmɐɾɐˈka]) is a tropical island and municipality in Pernambuco, Brazil on the Atlantic Ocean. Itamaracá means "stone shaker" in Tupi, from the words itá ("stone") and mbara'ká ("shaker"). It is separated from the mainland by the Canal de Santa Cruz, a salt water channel both mouths of which are on the Atlantic Ocean, and is connected to the mainland by a long road bridge.

Itamaracá has a total area of 66.68 square kilometres (25.75 mi^{2}) and had an estimated population of 26,672 inhabitants in 2020 according to IBGE. This is up from 16,000 in 2007, and reflects the increasing popularity of the island as a residential (rather than touristic) destination. It is located in the metropolitan area of Recife, the capital city of Pernambuco state, about an hour from Recife International Airport. The main activities of the population are fishing and, increasingly, tourism. Recife is located about 38 kilometres (24 mi) to the south whereas Olinda, another important town of Pernambuco and also UNESCO World Heritage, is 30 kilometres (19 mi) to the south. It was awarded city status on 1 January 1959.

About two thirds of the island is covered in protected natural rain forest ('Mata Atlantica'), with most human occupation and development occupying a narrow strip along the ocean front white sandy beaches, that stretch for around 12 km (7.5 miles) along the eastern coast. These beaches are protected by a reef 3 km (2 miles) off the coast, that encircles the island on the ocean side, making the island waters shallow, safe, and warm. Year round temperatures typically vary in a narrow range of 26-31C (79-88F), with the rainy season (occasional heavy rains, not monsoon) in May to July. Building regulations since 1995 have limited the number of floors in buildings to 2, resulting in a complete absence of high-rise apartment complexes, and no industry is allowed on the island.

== Geography ==
- State - Pernambuco
- Region - RMR (Recife)
- Boundaries - Goiana (N), Igarassu (S), Itapissuma (W), Atlantic Ocean (E)
- Area - 66.68 square kilometres (25.75 mi^{2})
- Elevation - 30 metres (98 ft)
- Hydrography - Small coast rivers, most only running in the winter, lakes
- Vegetation - Atlantic forest, numerous fruit trees (incl mango, avocado, coconut, cashew, and many others), mangrove
- Climate - Hot tropical and dry
- Annual average temperature - 29C (84F)
- Main roads - BR 101 (mainland), PE 35 and PE 01
- Distance to Recife - 38 km

== History ==
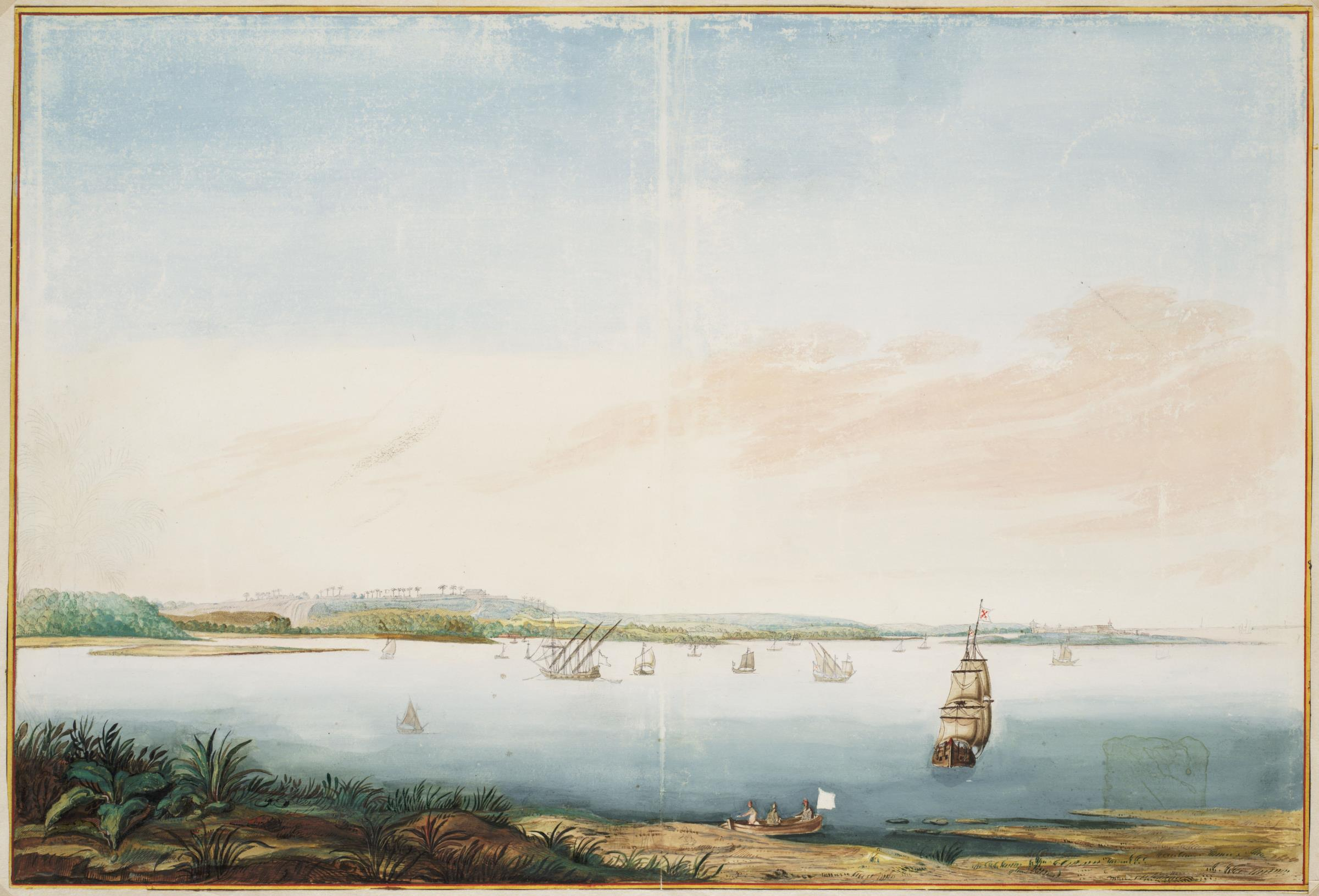
Painting by Johannes Vingboons of Itamaracá, 17th century

In the early 1500s before Portuguese colonization, when under Dutch control, the island was the site of a trading post for furs and other native goods, and transhipment depot for Brazilwood. In 1516, was founded the first sugar cane mill in Portuguese America - the oldest still-inhabited, Portuguese settlement in America. The island at that time was occupied by various loosely related tribes of Tupi-Guarani native peoples. Later, the island became part of the Captaincy of Itamaracá (most of which today is occupied by the state of Paraiba) which took its name from the island, established by King John III of Portugal in 1534. The chief economic activity in the following century and a half was sugar cane processing, in engenhos (sugar mills), and coconut production. While Itamaracá was administratively separate, it operated as a political and economic subdivision of Pernambuco. With the rise of the gold economy in the late 17th century, Itamaracá became economically isolated.

Itamaracá is reputed for having one of the first, if not the first, Jewish community in the Americas. In the Yosef Goldman Collection, there is a book titled Sefer Shefa Tal, a kabbalistic volume that was printed in Hanau, Germany, in 1612. It contains a handwritten statement of ownership by Rabbi Jacob Lagarto of a congregation in Tamarica, Brazil. Rabbi Lagarto came to Brazil as a young man and was the author of a volume of aphorisms (copies of which, evidently, no longer exist). The book is the only known physical link to this Jewish community, since there are no other known artifacts from it.

== Tourist attractions ==
- Beaches and water sports
- Forte Orange, first built by the Dutch in 1631 and rebuilt by the Portuguese in 1654
- Vila Velha, seat of the former Itamaracá Hereditary Captaincy (Church of Our Lady of the Conception, colonial houses)
- São João and Amparo "engenhos" (historic sugar mill and plantation complexes)
- Ibama's centre of sea mammals (Trichechus manatus)
- Nossa Senhora da Conceição: Second oldest church in Brazil

== People ==
The Ciranda singer/songwriter Lia de Itamaraca comes from here.

== Culture ==
Ilha de Itamaracá is renowned as the birthplace of one of Pernambuco’s most iconic dances, the ciranda. This dance is characterized by a large circle formed by participants holding hands, moving to a slow, repetitive rhythm. The ciranda was created by fishermen’s wives, who, while waiting for their husbands to return from the sea, kept themselves entertained with these movements.

== Economy ==
The main economic activities in Itamaraca are based in tourism, fishing and local commerce.

=== Economic indicators ===
Population	GDP x(1000 R$).	GDP pc (R$)	PE	RMR
18.658	76.266	4.340	0.13%	0.19%

Economy by Sector 2006

Primary sector	Secondary sector	Service sector
6.35%	14.84%	78.81%

=== Health indicators ===
HDI (2000)	Hospitals (2012)	Hospitals beds (2007)	Children's Mortality every 1000 (2005)
0.743	1	363	9.0

== Penal Facilities ==
Like many islands around the world, prisons were built there many years ago, (as many people could not swim at that time). Itamaracá island still has two prisons, which are nearing the end of a long term relocation program to a new facility being built near Itaquitinga on the mainland. The prisons are located on the leeward side of the island, away from the tourist areas, and have little impact other than the psychological awareness of their existence.

== Gallery ==
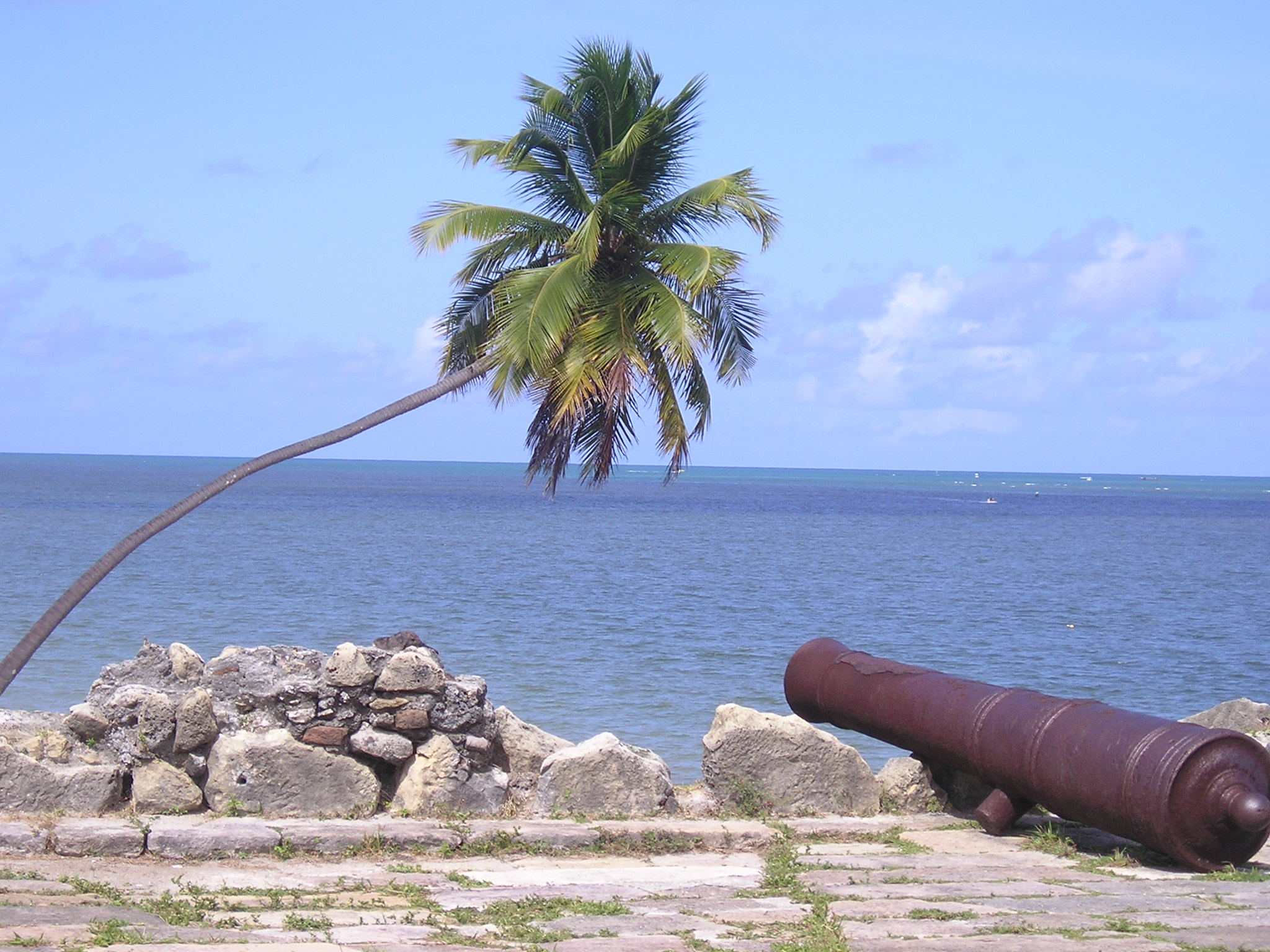
Forte Orange looking out to sea

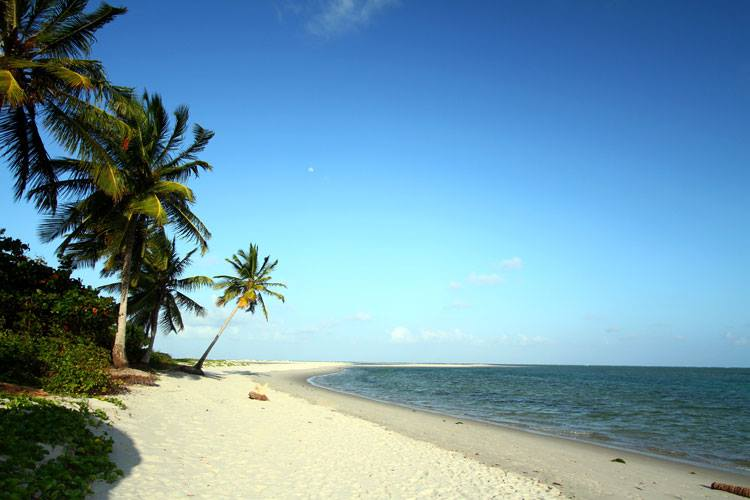
Coroa de Aviao beach looking out to sea

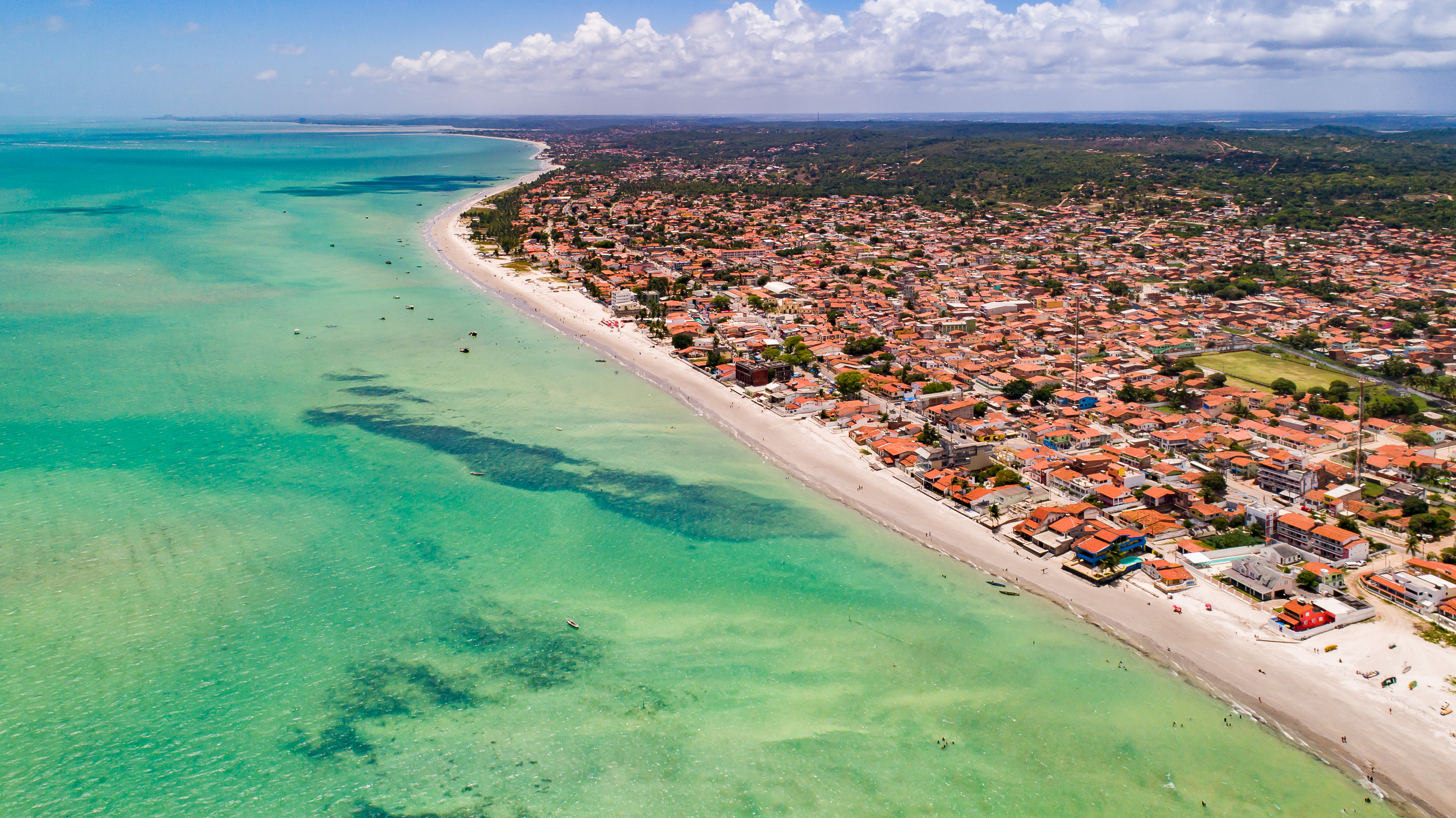
Pilar and beach

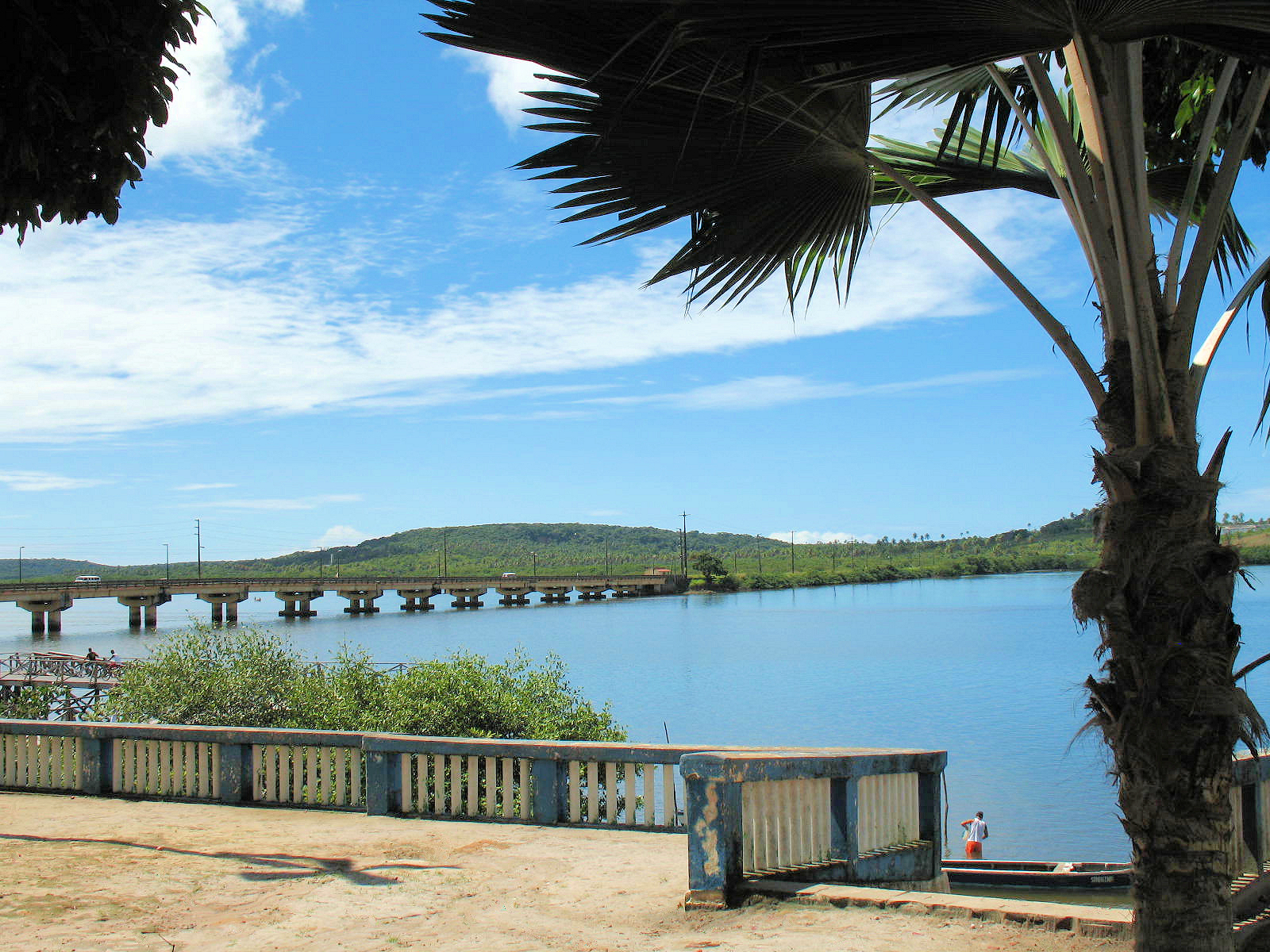
Bridge and causeway to the island

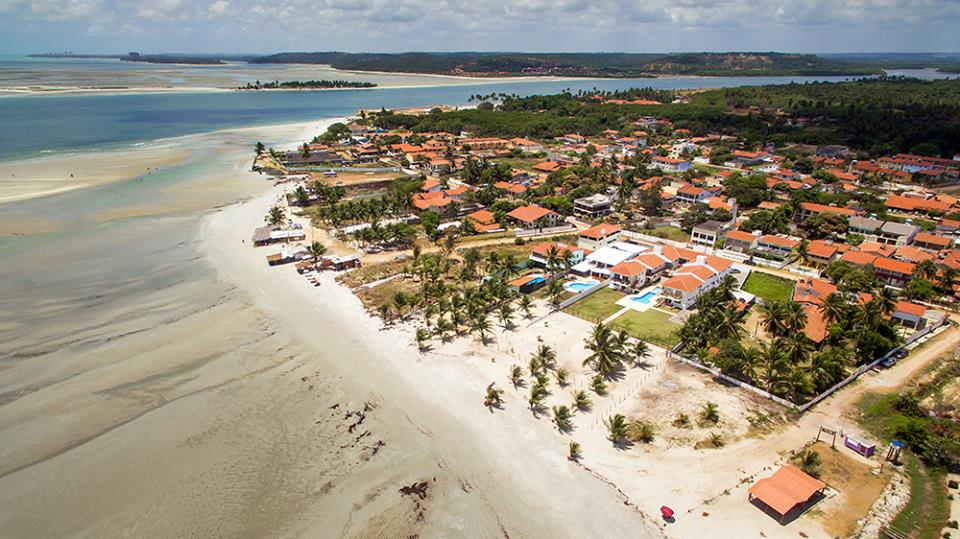
Forte Orange area looking towards Coroa

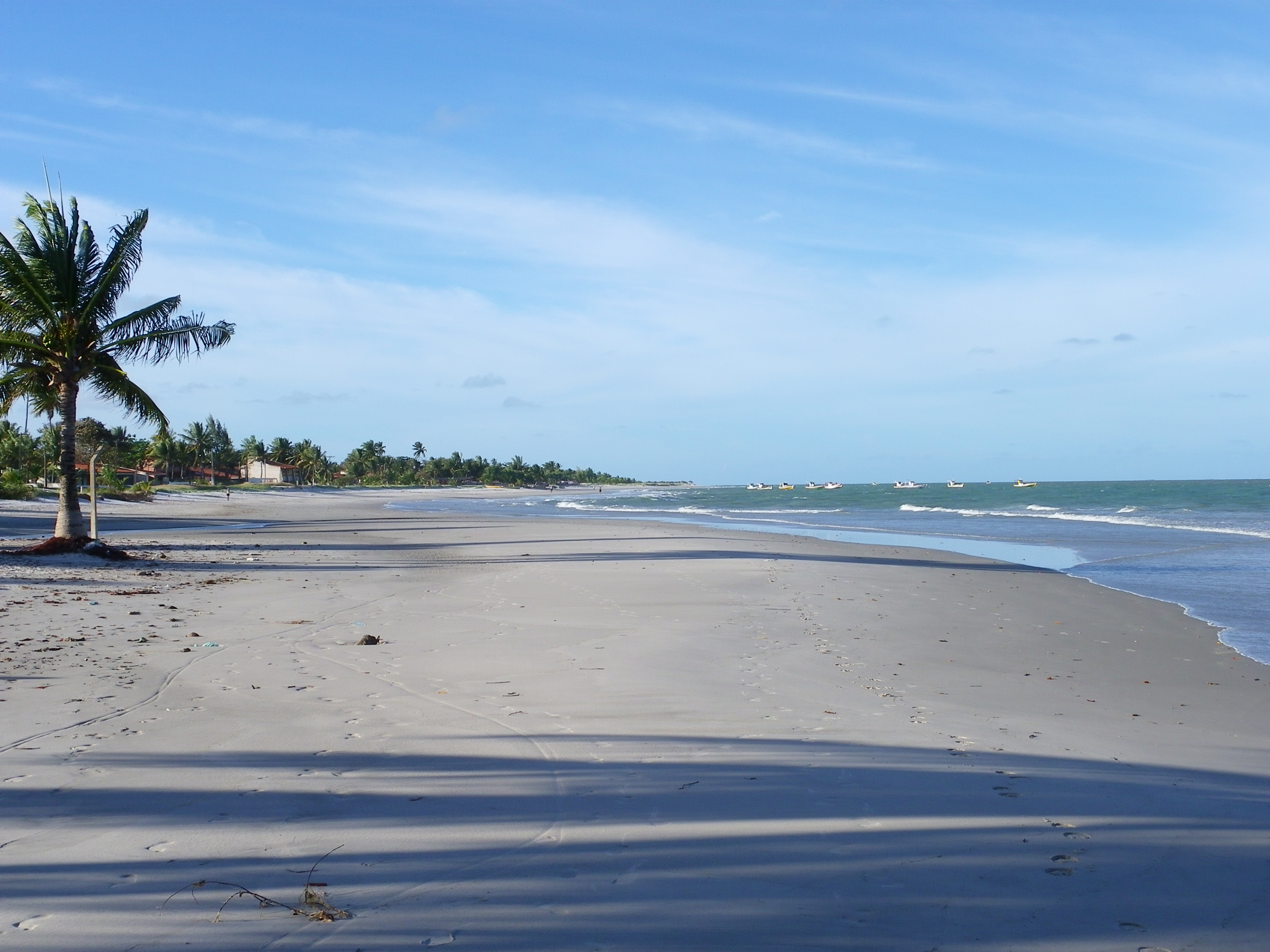
Rio Ambar beach

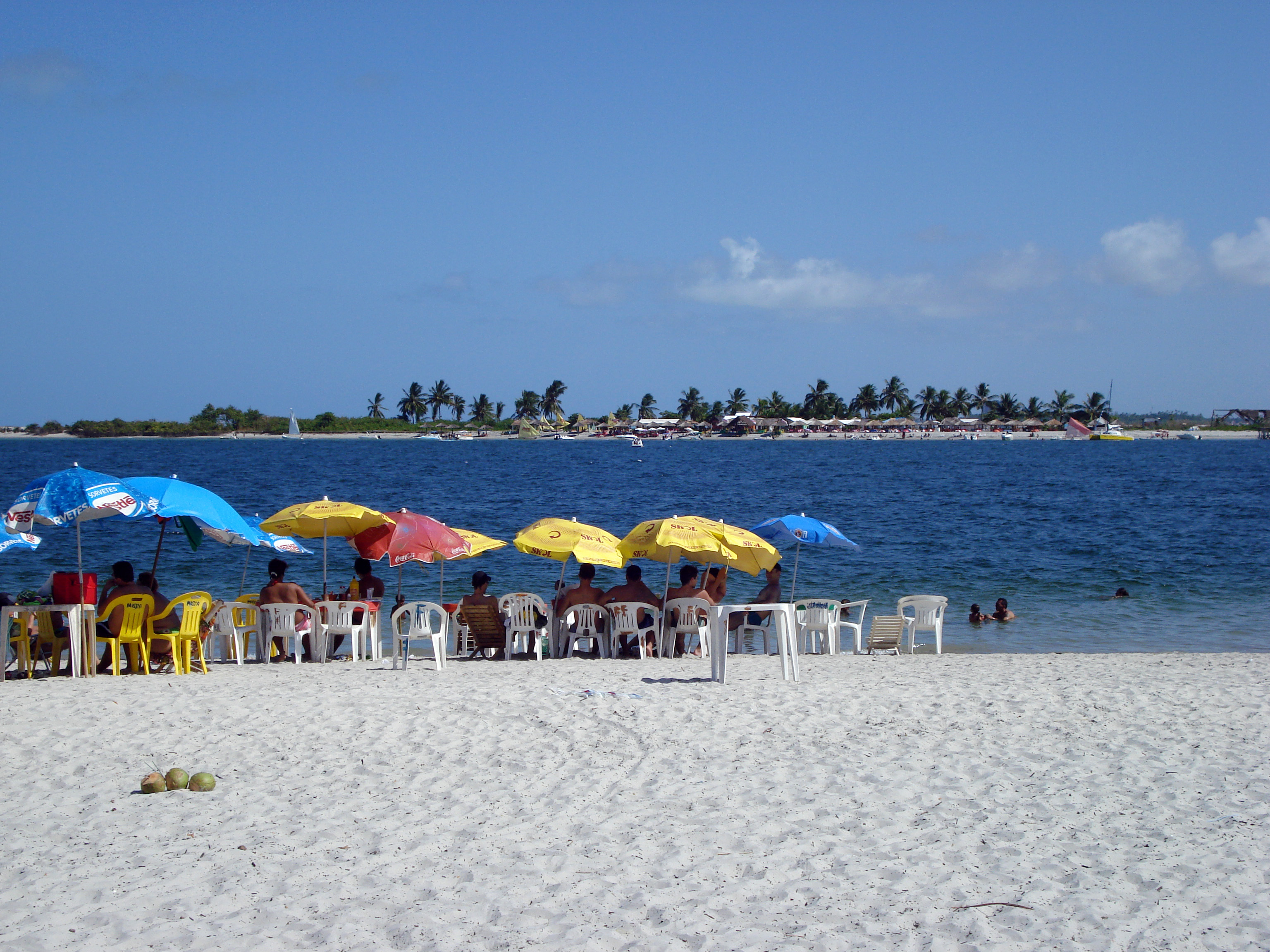
Forte Orange beach looking towards the Coroa islet

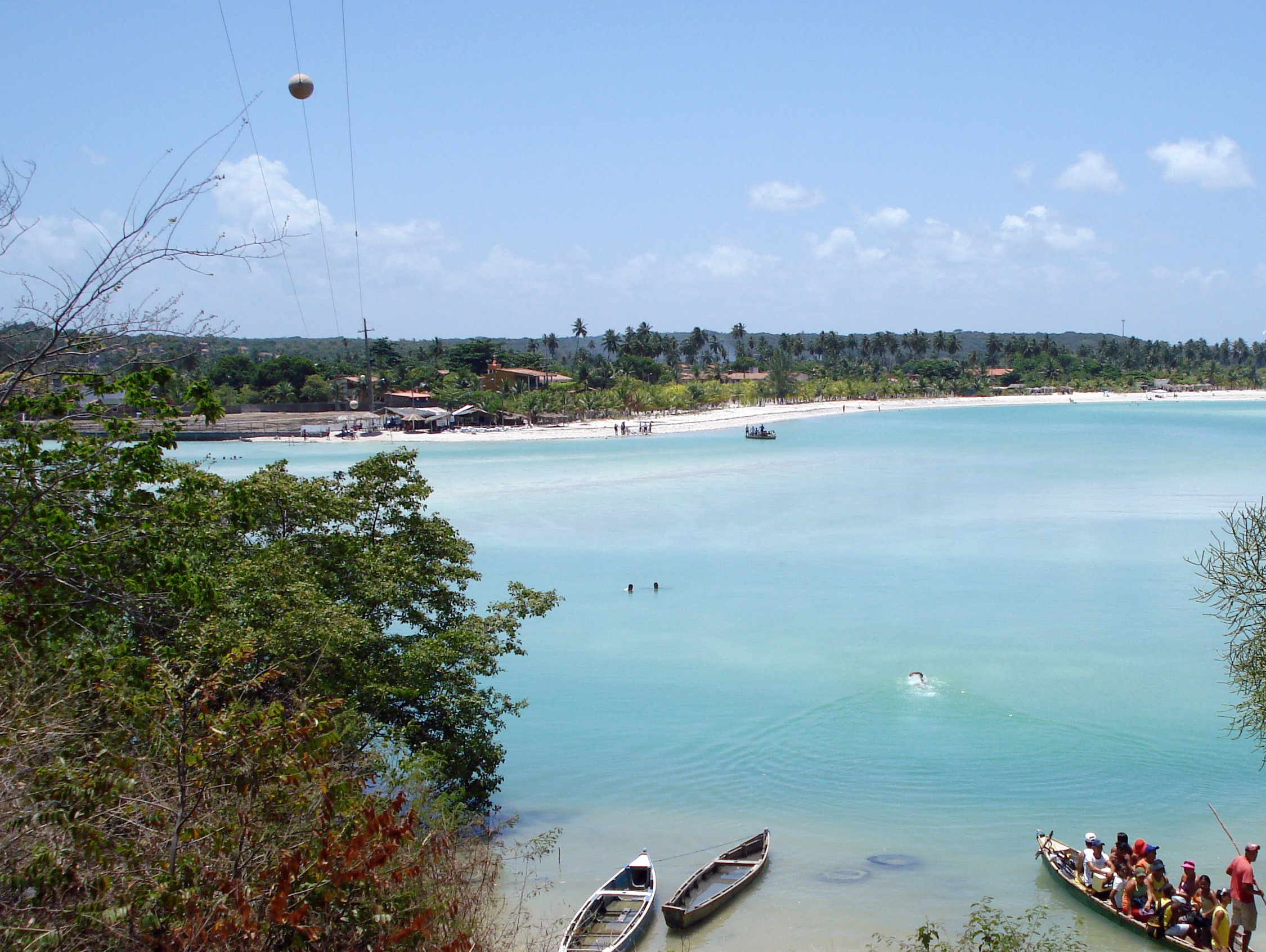
Estuary of river Jaguaribe

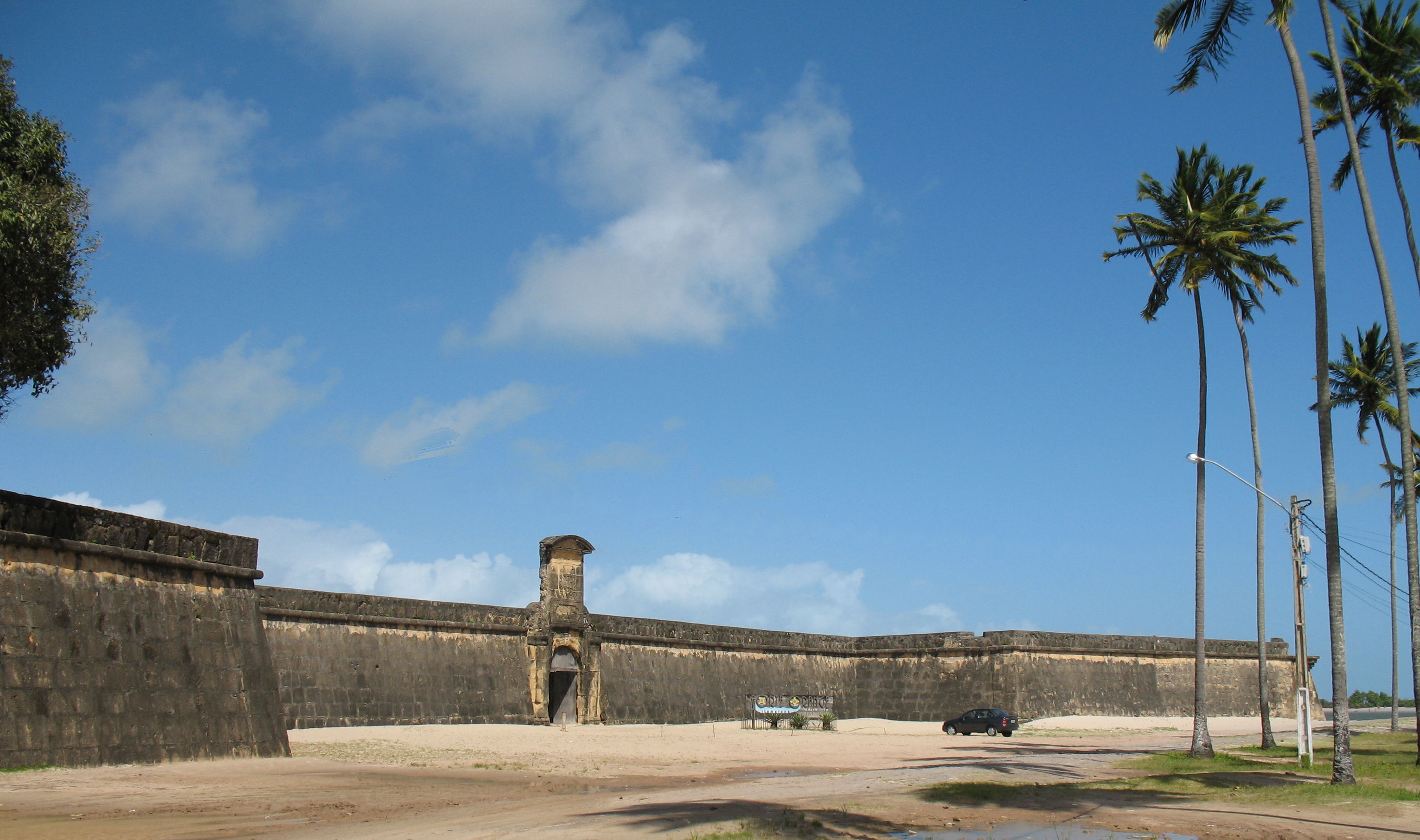
Forte Orange entrance (before restoration work)

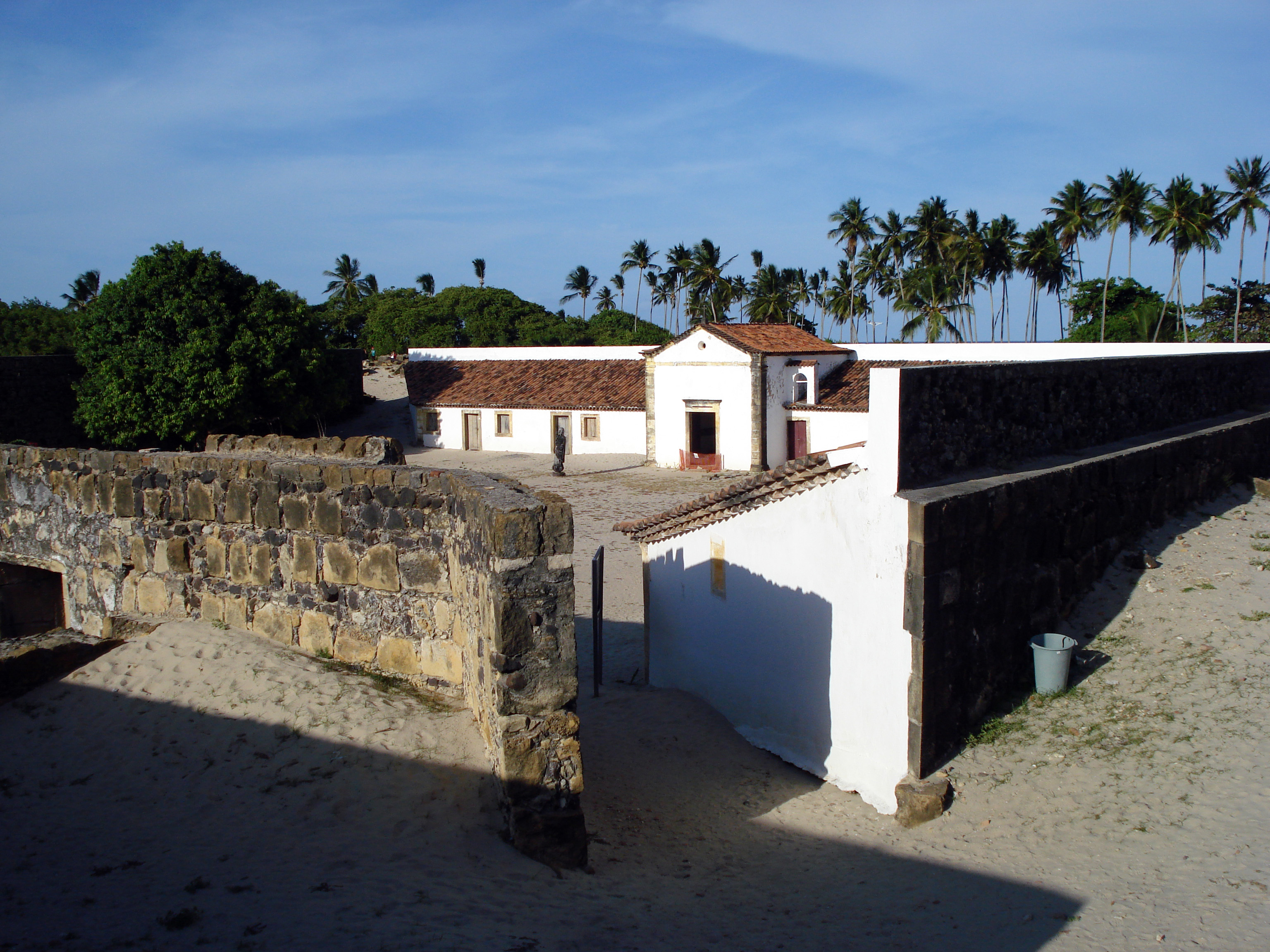
Fort Orange internal

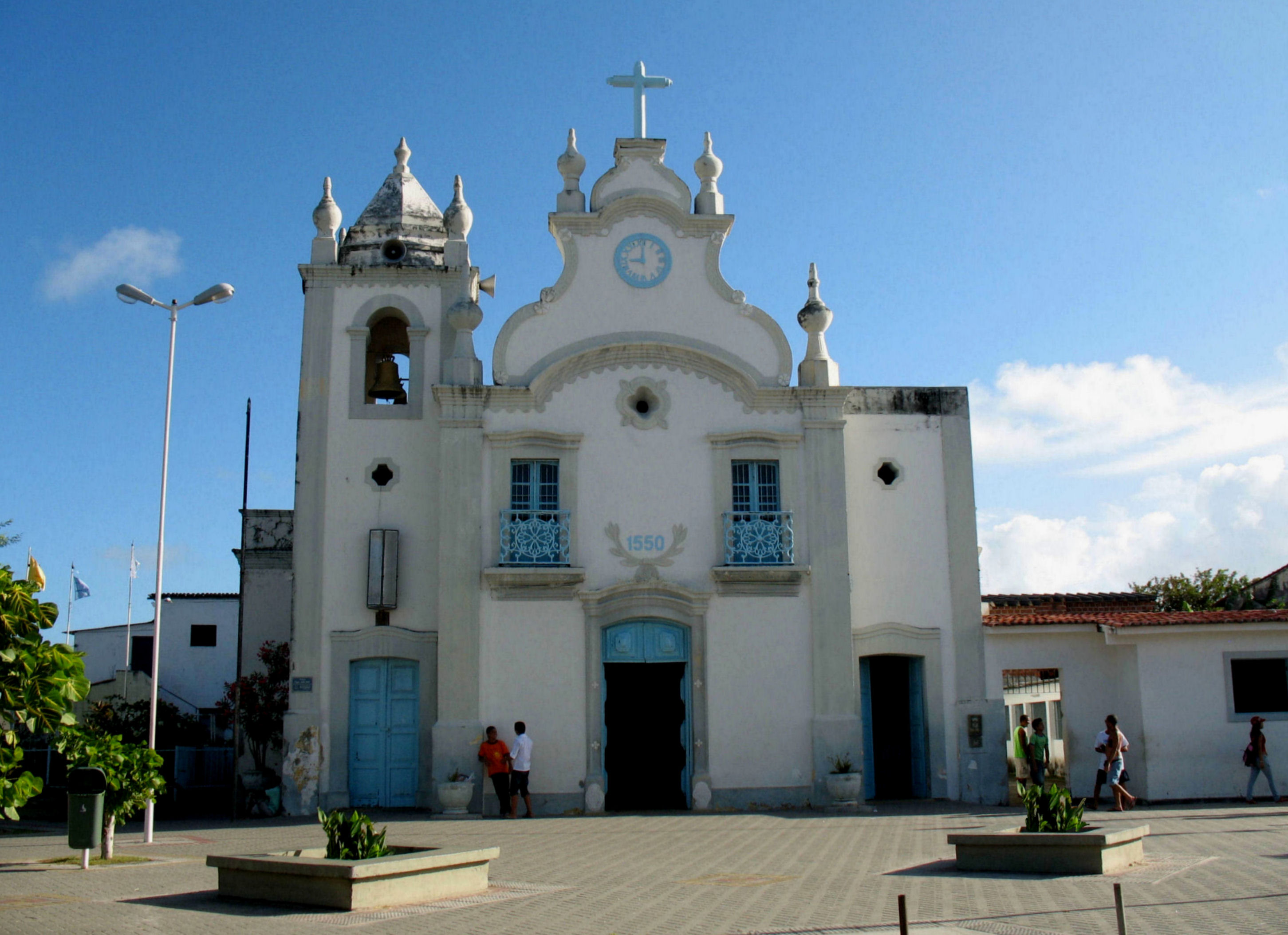
Pilar church

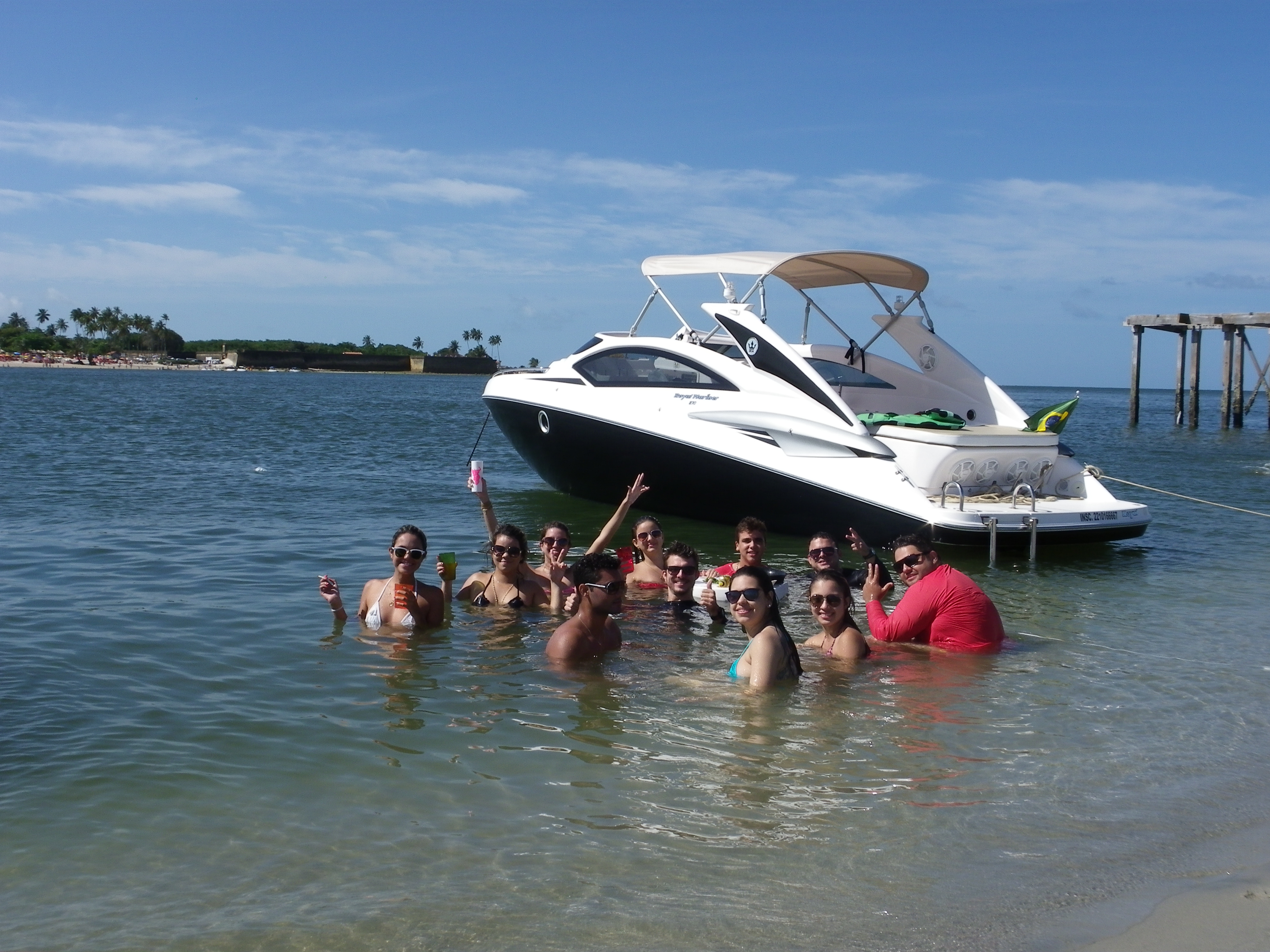
Party time!

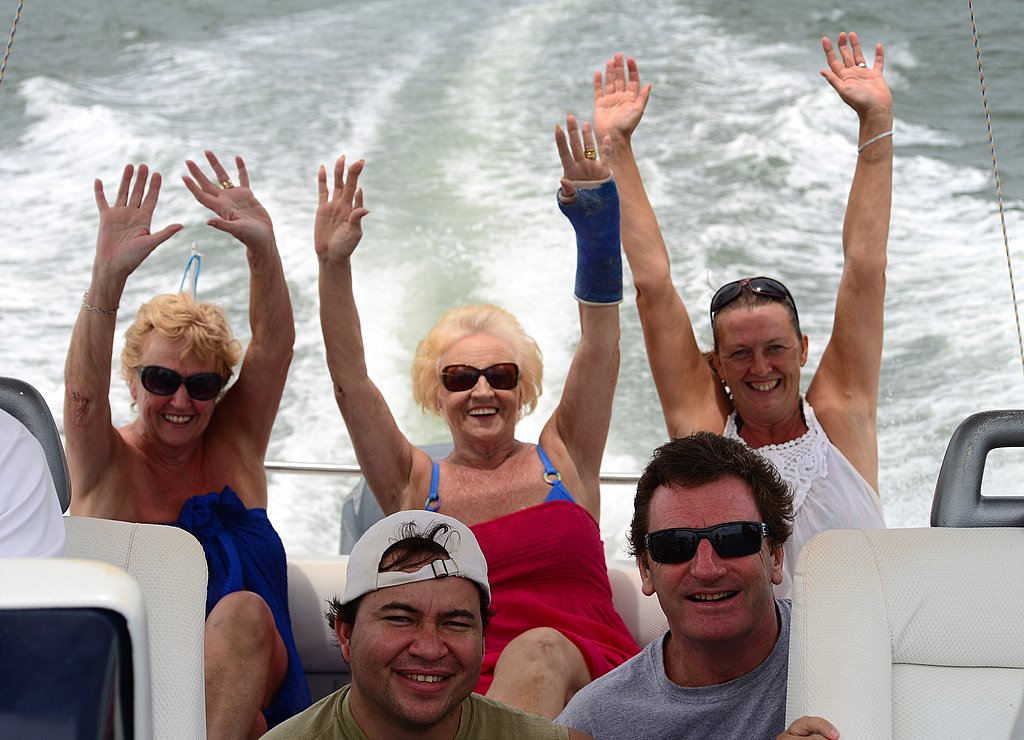
Messing about in boats round the island!

== See also ==
- List of islands of Brazil
- List of municipalities in Pernambuco
