= Susana de Sousa Dias =

Portuguese director

Susana de Sousa Dias (born in Lisbon) is a Portuguese artist and filmmaker.

== Life and career ==
After receiving a degree at Lisbon Theatre and Film School Susana de Sousa Dias took on another degree course in Painting at Lisbon Fine Arts School, where she graduated in 1991. In 2005, she received a M. Phil in Aesthetics and Philosophy of Art with a dissertation on Cinema, Archive and Memory that accompanied the making of her first long feature essay documentary film Natureza Morta (Still Life). In 2014, she received a PhD in Fine-Arts Video from the University of Lisbon, with a thesis on Archive footage and Decelerated Movement, a theoretical work that accompanied the making her second long feature essay documentary 48.

She is co-founder of the film production company Kintop. From 2010-2012, she was a member of the board of the Portuguese Documentary Association APORDOC and in 2012, she formed a women's collective who directed for two consecutive years the Lisbon International Documentary Festival Doclisboa. She engaged in the creation of new sections of the festival such as "Cinema of Urgency" and "Passages" (Documentary and Contemporary Art). One of the aspects of her work is the artistic integration of archival footage dating from the Portuguese dictatorship (1926-1974).

A turning point in De Sousa Dias's cinematographic work was her contact with the material gathered in archives of the Portuguese political police (Arquivo Pide/DGS) while preparing her documentary Processo-Crime 141-53 (Criminal-Case 141-53). The film was, at the same time, the starting point for questioning the role and the usage of archival footage in documentaries and history writing. The first film she made that can be considered as a direct reflection of the experience was Natureza Morta (Still Life) (2005), a Portuguese-French co-production, only consisting of archive footage and sound, that deliberately renounced on the usage of spoken discourse. The film was awarded with the Merit Award at Taiwan Documentary Film Festival in 2006 and the Atalanta Films Award at Doclisboa 2006.

48 (2010) is her best-known feature. On the film, Scott MacDonald writes: "Nearly all the images in De Sousa Dias's remarkable third feature, 48, are extended close-ups of the mugshots of political prisoners during which we hear the political prisoners' memories of the humiliations they endured. The visual challenge in 48 was how to make a moving film from still photographs." De Sousa Dias developed an approach through montage which she calls a "montage within the shot" in "temporal depth".

For this film, she was awarded several prizes such as the Grand Prix 2010 Cinéma du Réel, the FIPRESCI award at DOK Leipzig 2010, the Grand Prize 2011 at Mar del Plata International Independent Film Festival, Argentina, Special Mention 2011 Punto de Vista International Documentary Film Festival, Opus Bonum Award for Best International Documentary, 2010, Jihlava International Documentary Film Festival, and the Don Quijote Award 2010 of the International Federation of Film Societies.

Besides her career as a film director, De Sousa Dias works in the field of visual arts. In 2010, she presented for the first time an installation in three screens and Dolby 5.1 sound of Natureza Morta – Stilleben (2010) in the National Museum of Contemporary Art - Chiado Museum in Lisbon. In 2017, she finished her film Luz Obscura (Obscure Light) that was awarded with a Special Mention at the International Festival Documenta Madrid of the same year, for the "unique aesthetical and narrative approach". The film was later awarded with the Prix Spécial du Documentaire Historique (les Rendez-vous de l'Histoire, Blois) and the Best Sound Award at the Festival Caminhos do Cinema Português.

Fordlandia Malaise (2019) premiered at the 69th edition of the Berlin International Film Festival.

Journey to the Sun (2021), co-directed with Ansgar Schaefer, premiered at the International Documentary Film Festival Amsterdam and has been shown in film festivals worldwide such as the Seville European Film Festival, New Horizons Film Festival and Uruguay International Film Festival.

De Sousa Dias's works have also been shown in the context of contemporary arts exhibitions like PHotoEspaña (official selection 2011) and Documenta 14 (Keimena).

Her latest film, Fordlândia Panacea, will premiere at the International Documentary Film Festival Amsterdam in November 2025.

She is the author of various essays on cinema, mainly dealing with subjects related to her own work, such as "(In)visible Evidence: the Representability of Torture" in A Companion to Contemporary Documentary Film, Wiley-Blackwell, 2015, and "A sort of microscope of time: decelerated movement and archive footage" in Thinking Reality and Time through film, Cambridge Scholar Publishing, 2017.

== Filmography ==
Year	Title	Role	Notes
2000	Processo-Crime 141-53	Director	
2005	Natureza Morta	Director	
2009	48	Director	
2017	Luz Obscura	Director	
2019	Fordlandia Malaise	Director	
2021	Journey to the Sun	Director	
2025	Fordlândia Panacea	Director	World Premiere at IDFA

== Installations ==
- Still Life / Stilleben, 2010
- Why do We Show The Hours of Light and Darkness in the Same Circle? (I) [Numbers], 2022
- Why do We Show The Hours of Light and Darkness in the Same Circle? (II) [Tentativa], 2024
- By The Sea We Hear the World, 2024

== Bibliography ==
- Jacinto Lageira, Un entrelacement de poétiques, L'art comme histoire, Paris, Editions Mimésis, 2016.
- Scott MacDonald, "Susana De Sousa Dias" in Avant-Doc: Intersections of Documentary and Avant-Garde Cinema, NY, Oxford University Press, 2015.
- Emília Tavares, The imprisoned Images: on Susana Sousa Dias’s 48 in Photography and Cinema: 50 Years of Chris Marker’s La Jetée.
- Cristina Pratas Cruzeiro, "Susana de Sousa Dias’ 48: images that speak against themselves", n.paradoxa - international feminist art journal, volume 35, Jan 2015
- Horacio M. Fernández e Iván V. Álvarez, "Explorando la memoria traumática: Susana de Sousa Dias y el archivo salazarista" in Jugar con la memoria: El cine portugués en el siglo XXI, Santander, Shangrila Ed, 2014.;
- Agnieszka Piotrowska, Psychoanalysis and Ethics in Documentary Film, London, NY, Routledge, 2013;
- Carolin Overhoff Ferreira, "Face a face com a ditadura: os filmes indisciplinares de Susana de Sousa Dias" in O Cinema Português, Aproximações à sua história e indisciplinaridade, São Paulo, 2013.
- Laurent Véray, Les images d’archives face à l’histoire. De la conservation à la création, Chasseneuil-du-Poitou/Paris, Éd. scérén, cndp-crdp, 2011.
- Stéphanie Benzaquen, Behind bars: Artistic appropriation of prisoners’ headshots in the works of Susana de Sousa Dias, Binh Danh and Clarisse Hahn, Kunstlicht, jrg 32 - n.4, pp. 24 – 33, The Nederlands, 2011.
- Charlotte Garson, 48 de Susana de Sousa Dias, Images Documentaires, 67-68, France, 2010
- Amalia Liakou, "Antinomie de la photographie du corps politique: Susana de Sousa Dias", Politique de la Photographie du Corps, Les Editions Klincksieck, Paris, 2011.
