= Fort Orange (Dutch Brazil) =

- Forte de Santa Cruz de Itamaracá
- Itamaracá Island, Pernambuco in Brazil
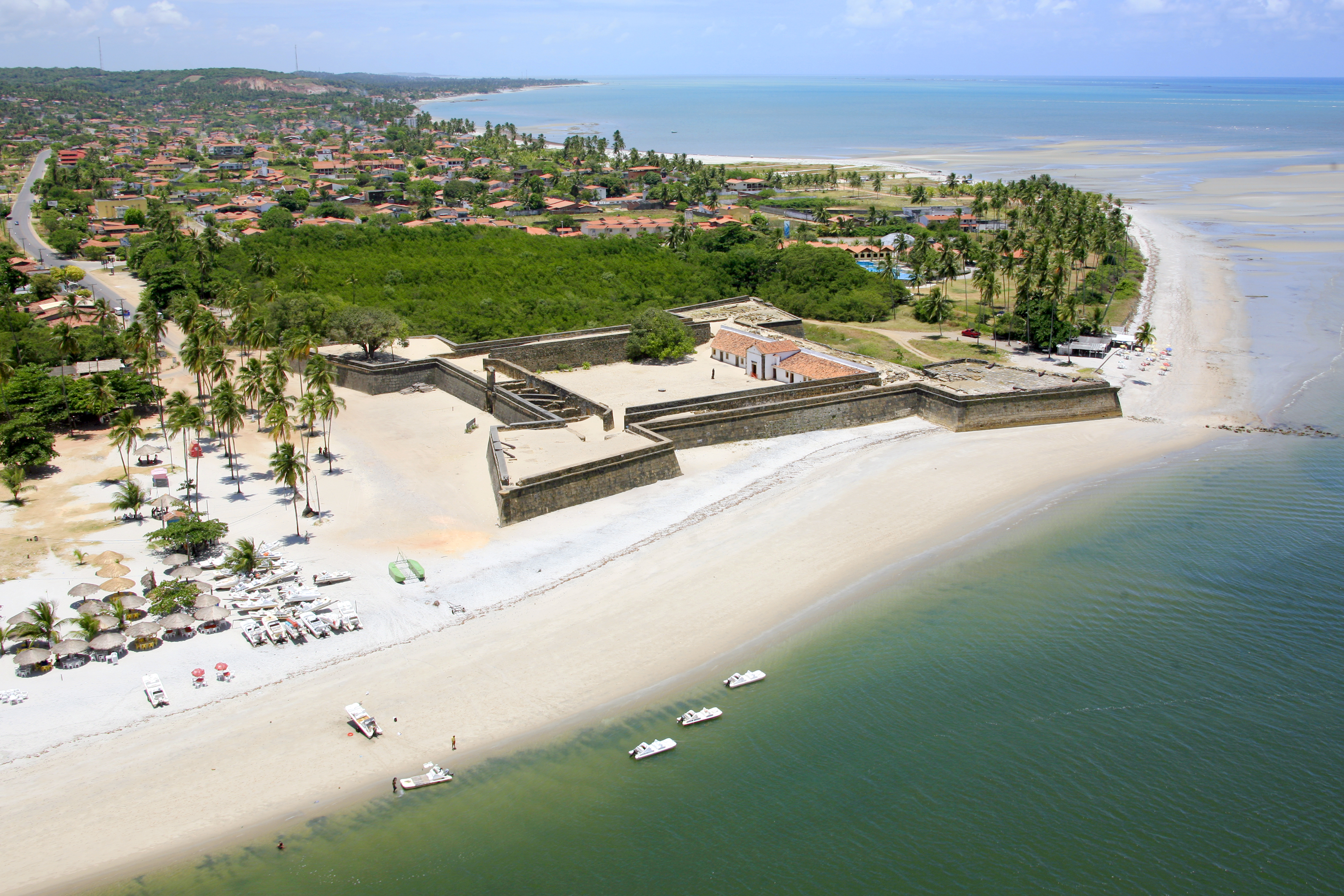

Site information
- Type: Fort
- Open to the public: Yes
- Condition: Good

Location
- Location of Fort Orange in Brazil
- Coordinates: 7°48′38″S 34°50′22″W

Site history
- Built: 1631
Designations
National Historic Heritage of Brazil
- Designated: 1938
- Reference no.: 101

The Fort of Santa Cruz de Itamaracá (Holy cross of Itamaracá), popularly known as Fort Orange, is located on Itamaracá Island on the north coast of the state of Pernambuco in Brazil.

In the context of the second Dutch invasions in Brazil, it was originally a small island (now lost) in front of the tip of the Southeast Itamaracá Island, where the bar dominated the southern channel of Santa Cruz.

== History ==
=== Background: The Dutch fort ===
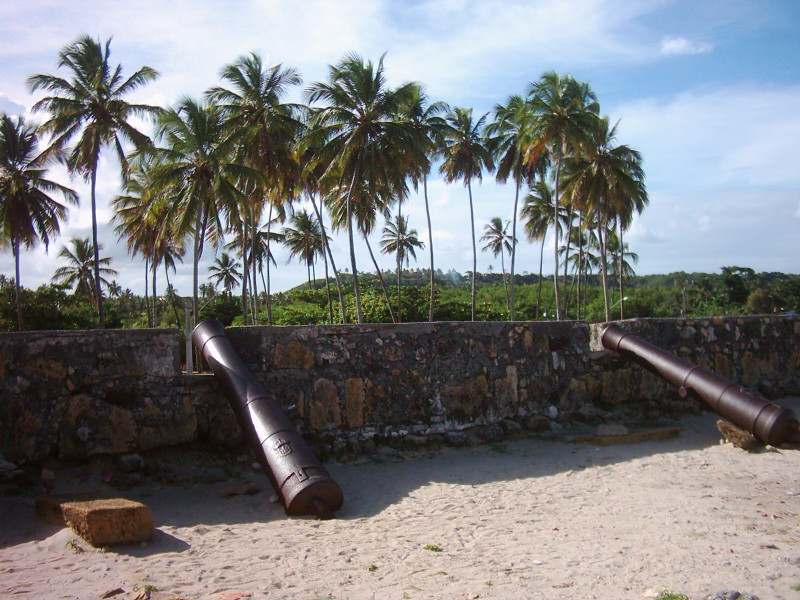
Fort Orange in Pernambuco

It was started from May 1631 as a fortification campaign by Dutch forces (Barretto, 1958:133), under the command of Steyn Callenfels and received the name Fort Orange, in homage to the House of Orange-Nassau, which then ruled the Netherlands.

It was garrisoned by a detachment of 366 men under the command of the Polish Captain Crestofle d'Artischau Arciszewski. This effectively resisted the Portuguese forces commanded by Conde of Bagnoli, who defeated (1632), withdrew abandoning its artillery: four pieces of brass brought from Arraial Velho do Bom Jesus. This position formed the basis for the conquest of the island of Itamaracá, defended by the forces of Salvador Pinheiro. After this achievement (1633), the fort was repaired and expanded.

In this structure, Maurice of Nassau reported:

(…) Inside the bar [of the island of Itamaracá] presents the first strong Orange, situated on a low sand separated from the mainland by a creek, which is fordable low-water mark. This fort dominates the harbor entrance, since such vessels entering have to pass before him the shot gun. It is square with four bastions [the vertices], and lately has been raised and repaired, but almost no gaps, or stockade or palisade, which is necessary to make, and should widen the gap and surround the outside with a counter-scarp.

— Nassau, Maurice of. Short Address. January 14, 1638.

This is complemented by van der Dussen, which gives two companies with a headcount of 182 men:

(…) Fort Orange, at the southern entrance of the channel, which is the main port of the island [Itamaracá]. It is a strong square with four bastions, high, in a ditch some distance, but little deep and dry, is surrounded by a strong palisade. There are 12 cannon, namely: 6 bronze and 6 iron. The brass are 1 of 26 lb, 1 of 18 lb, 3 of 12 lb and 1 of 6 lb, the iron are: May 2 of 5 lb and 4 of 4 lb.

— Adriaen van der Dussen. Report on the status of the provinces conquered in Brazil. April 4, 1640.

Barléu (1974) transcribes the information:

(…) The [Fort] of Orange, in the southern mouth of the harbor. It has four bastions and is surrounded by a stockade, for lack of water in the ditches. It is armed with 12 guns, 6 bronze and 6 of iron. (op. cit, p. 143) assigns him the same effective of 182 men (op. cit., p. 146). Regarding the fence, this was determined by Nassau on the verge of an attack the Spanish fleet to the northeast Dutch (c. 1639): "(...) Protected Maurice also Fort of Orange on the island of Itamaracá in sticking of the stockade (...)." (op. cit., p. 159).

According to Bento (1971), when the Portuguese counter-offensive to the island of Itamaracá in June 1646 by the combined forces of the Master-of-Field André Vidal de Negreiros (1606–80) and Master-of-Field João Fernandes Vieira (1602–81) Sergeant-Major Antonio Dias Cardoso was in charge of attack and raze the fortifications Dutch, which was met, eighteen pieces Fettering artillery, and organizing strongholds bordering the island with some of these pieces.

Although it is unclear whether this was achieved particularly strong or not, on occasion the fort suffered heavy damage and was rebuilt from 1649.

=== Under Portuguese rule ===
After the Dutch capitulation in Recife (1654), and subsequently abandoned the fort occupied by the Portuguese forces under the command of Colonel Francisco de Figueroa (GARRIDO, 1940:62). Renamed asFort of Santa Cruz de Itamaracá, the Portuguese military engineer continued the reconstruction in stone masonry and lime in the form of a quadrangular polygon with regular pentagonal bastions at the corners in the system Vauban, Bartizans from stone, armorial gate, and barracks for the troops, and lockers under the walls, enveloping the embankment.

Despite undergoing repairs in 1696 - when its garrison consisted of a Sergeant-Major, a Captain, a Lieutenant, a Sergeant, a Constable, and two companies of Thirds of Recife and is strapped with twenty-five cannon of sizes from 20 to 12 (GARRIDO, 1940:62) - and 1777 in 1800, it was abandoned and in ruins. New restoration was provided in 1817, the year that was occupied by the forces of Father Tenório, in the context of Pernambuco Revolution (1817). SOUZA (1885), at the time (1885), gave him twenty-three pieces, pointing him to ruin (op. cit., P. 81).

=== Today ===
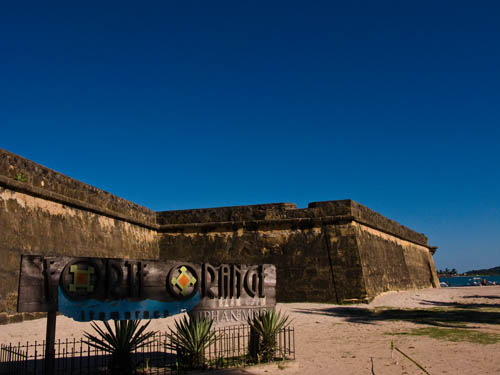

Protected in 1938 by then National Historic and Artistic Heritage Services, consolidation by small interventions performed in 1966 and 1973, a time when the island began to project itself as tourist resort. In 1971, the Archaeology Laboratory of the Federal University of Pernambuco held the fort prospecting in part, identified areas of the kitchen, the chapel, the rooms and lockers, and recovering various objects of personal use, guns and ammunition of various calibres. The Department of the Army began their reforms in the early 1980s, from the administration for the City of Itamaracá (1984). It is from this period date the involvement of ex-convict and craftsman José Amaro de Souza Filho with storage and maintenance freestanding monument by revenue from the sale of crafts place, a situation that lasted until 1992. From 1991, with the creation by José Amaro of the Fort Orange Foundation, this entity began to take charge of the administration of the fort, until 1998. At this point, the property was taken over by City Hall being passed to the Ministry of Culture (1998), which in turn forwarded it to the Foundation to Support the Development of the Federal University of Pernambuco, Fade/UFPE.

The Fade, a private nonprofit, from 2000 coordinated the project of archaeological research, UFPE Project (Fort Orange), with funding from the MOWIC Foundation, the Ministry of Foreign Affairs of the Netherlands, Ministry of Culture of Brazil, by the Iphan, and the State Government of Pernambuco.

Two new campaigns archaeological prospection took place: the first of January to March 2002 and the second from October 2002 to June 2003. The work also included building defenses against the sea, with funding from the City Council as well as interventions of restoration and installation of a museum containing the archaeological remains found in excavations, with funding from the State of Pernambuco and Iphan.

== Tourism and Access ==
Located in the city of Itamaraca, and about 50 km north of Recife, can be accessed by highways BR-101 North, PE and PE-35-01. Tours are daily from 8 am to 5 pm. With an influx of visitors currently estimated at around 70 thousand people per year, the structure of the fort is one of the most important tourism attractions of Pernambuco. Under good storage conditions are recommended to visit the Chapel, as well as studio and craft shop of Joseph Amaro, specializing in carved wood.

== Bibliography ==
- Barléu Gaspar. History of the made recently practiced for eight years in Brazil.Belo Horizonte: Editora Itatiaia, São Paulo: Editora da Universidade de São Paulo, 1974. 418 p. il.
- Barreto, Anibal (Cel.). Fortifications in Brazil(Historical Summary).Rio de Janeiro: Army Library Publishing, 1958. 368 p.
- BENEDICT, Claudio Moreira (Maj. QEMA Eng). The Battle of Guararapes - Description and Military Analysis (2 vol .). Recife: Universidade Federal de Pernambuco, 1971.
- GARRIDO, Carlos Miguez. Fortifications of Brazil. Reprint of Vol IIIGrants for Maritime History of Brazil.Rio de Janeiro: Imprensa Naval, 1940.
- MELLO, José Antonio Gonsalves of (ed.). Sourcesin the history of Dutch Brazil (vs. 1).Recife: National Historical Park-dos Guararapes; MEC / SPHAN / Fundação Pró-Memória, 1981. 264 p.
- SOUZA, Augusto Fausto de. Fortifications in Brazil. RIHGB. Rio de Janeiro: Tomo XLVIII, Part II, 1885. p. 5-140.

== See also ==
- History of Pernambuco
- Cristóvão Jacques
