= Emerging Producers =

European filmmaking workshop

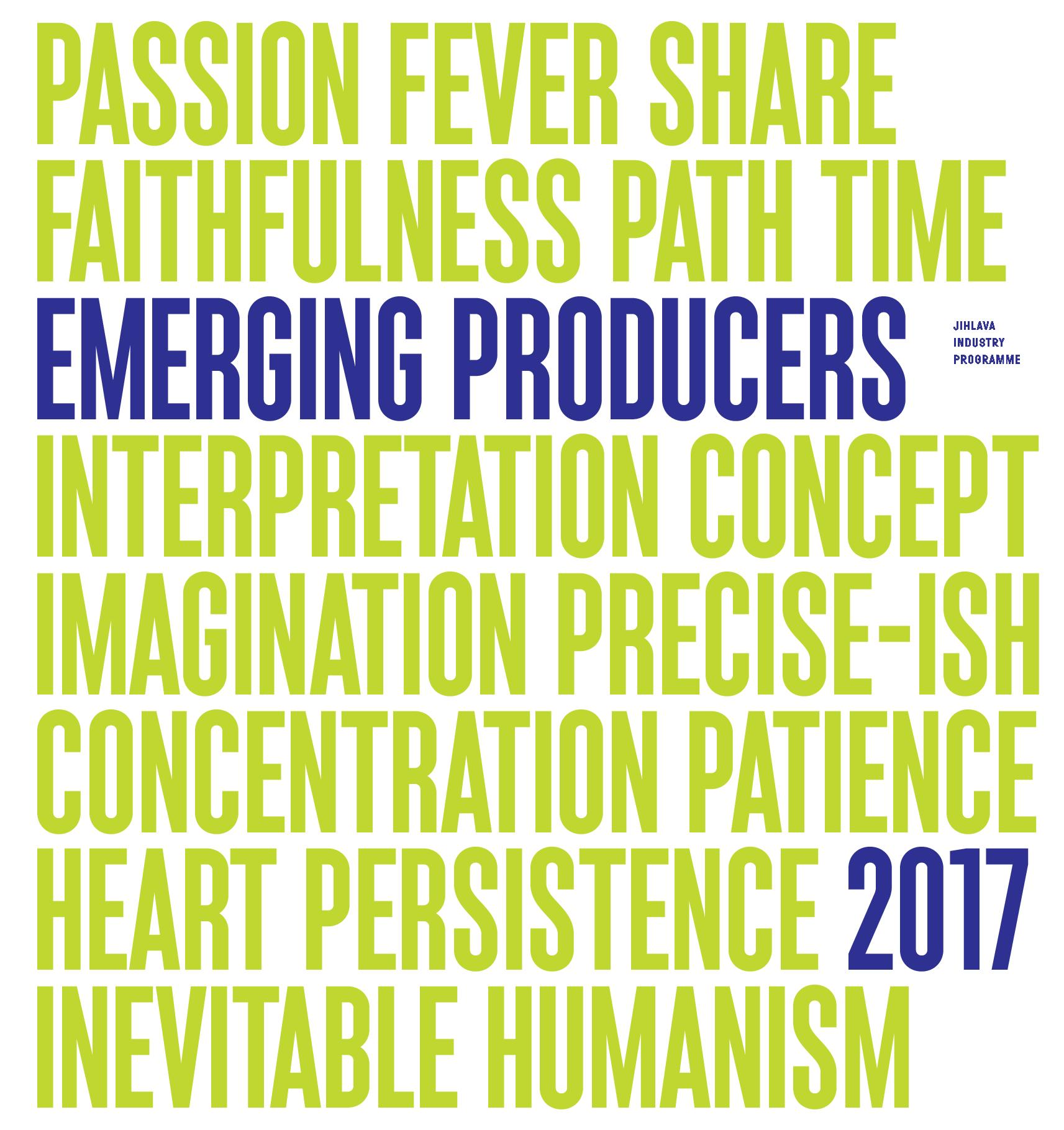
Title page of the Emerging Producers catalogue, designed by Juraj Horváth

Emerging Producers is an educational and promotional workshop, organised since 2012 by Ji.hlava International Documentary Film Festival as part of its Industry Programme. The project is focused on the support of talented European documentary film producers by helping them with orientation in the film market, creating the space for coproduction, and arranging the contact with leading film professionals. It is the only programme of its kind designed for documentary film producers in Europe.

Every year, 18 documentary film producers are selected from Europe and one non-European guest country (Morocco in 2018, Chile in 2019). The workshop has two parts - the first one takes place at the end of October in Jihlava, Czech Republic during the Ji.hlava IDFF, the second one takes place in February of the following year in Berlin. Application deadline is traditionally in March (e.g. March 15, 2023 for the participation in Emerging Producers 2024).

In the past, there has been a number of experienced film professionals among the workshop tutors, such as Amra Bakšić Ćamo, Heino Deckert, Paolo Benzi, Irena Taskovski, Luciano Barisone, Peter Jäger, Sibyl Kurz, Rebecca O'Brien. In total, the project has already presented 199 producers from 43 countries, many of whom have established themselves as successful film professionals. Every year, Emerging Producers is accompanied by a unique catalogue with its graphic style made by renowned Czech graphic designer Juraj Horváth.
