= Madalena Perdigão =

Portuguese cultural administrator and educator

- Born: Maria Madalena Bagão da Silva Biscaia; 28 April 1923; Figueira da Foz, Portugal
- Died: 5 December 1989 (aged 66); Lisbon, Portugal
- Citizenship: Portuguese
- Education: University of Coimbra; National Conservatory of Lisbon
- Occupations: Art educator; promoter of cultural development;
- Known for: Work for the Calouste Gulbenkian Foundation
- Spouse(s): 1. João Farinha (1956–57); 2. José de Azeredo Perdigão (1960–1989)
- Parent(s): Severo da Silva Biscaia; Lídia Maria de Jesus Bagão

Maria Madalena Bagão da Silva Biscaia de Azeredo Perdigão (28 April 1923 –5 December 1989), played an important role in the cultural life of Portugal in the second half of the 20th century, particularly as a result of her association with the Calouste Gulbenkian Foundation in the Portuguese capital of Lisbon, where she founded and directed the Foundation's Music Service and later directed the Serviço de Animação, Criação Artística e Educação pela Arte (ACARTE – Animation, Artistic Creation, and Art Education Service).

== Early life ==
Perdigão was born on 28 April 1923 in Figueira da Foz. She was the daughter of Lídia Maria de Jesus Bagão da Silva Biscaia and Severo da Silva Biscaia and the eldest of three sisters. Her father was a Republican and a staunch opponent of António de Oliveira Salazar, leader of the Estado Novo dictatorship in Portugal, while her mother was a strict Catholic. After finishing her high school studies, Perdigão entered the Faculty of Sciences of the University of Coimbra, where she graduated with distinction in Mathematics in 1944. A piano student, she became president of several musical associations in Coimbra and elsewhere and also belonged to the Teatro dos Estudantes (Student theatre) of the University of Coimbra. She joined the feminist Conselho Nacional das Mulheres Portuguesas (National Council of Portuguese Women), serving on its Propaganda and Organization committee.

Perdigão then completed the Higher Piano Course at the National Conservatory of Lisbon in 1948, before continuing her studies in Paris. She performed as a soloist in concerts with the Symphonic Orchestra of the Emissora Nacional, the national radio station. She was also responsible for a radio programme called A Música e os Seus Sortilégios (Music and its Spells).

In 1956 she married João Farinha, an assistant professor at the Faculty of Sciences of the University of Coimbra. While both were in Paris, he on a Gulbenkian scholarship and she on one from the Institute of High Culture, he died suddenly in September 1957. In 1960, she married José de Azeredo Perdigão, the first president of the Calouste Gulbenkian Foundation.

== Career ==
From 1958 to 1974, Perdigão worked at the Calouste Gulbenkian Foundation on the creation and direction of its Music Service. The Foundation is dedicated to the promotion of the arts, science, and education and is one of the wealthiest charitable foundations in the world, having been founded by Calouste Gulbenkian, an international oil trader. Her achievements included the establishment of the Gulbenkian Orchestra in 1962, the Gulbenkian Choir in 1964 and the Gulbenkian Ballet in 1965, as well as the staging of 13 Gulbenkian Music Festivals between 1958 and 1970. She was also president of the Steering Committee for the Reform of the National Conservatory between 1971 and 1974.

Following the overthrow of the Estado Novo at the time of the 1974 Carnation Revolution, Perdigão left the Gulbenkian Foundation in 1975, having been invited by the new Government to contribute to the restructuring of national artistic education, chairing the working group dedicated to this reform. She was president of the first international festival of music of Lisbon in 1983. In 1984 she returned to the Gulbenkian to establish its Animation, Artistic Creation, and Art Education Service (ACARTE). She believed that “the great traditional artistic areas......are in a process of continuous evolution, in order to be able to respond to the demands of society, itself also in evolution, and to respond to their intrinsic needs for development and progress”. Thus, ACARTE was intended to promote more effective communication between the public and works of art, increase artistic creation, and promote education through art. Among her activities was the creation of the Centro Artístico Infantil (CAI - Children's Artistic Center) at the Gulbenkian.

== Awards and honours ==
In 1988, Perdigão was distinguished with the "Women of Europe" award, which recognized the role of a woman or group of women from one of the EEC countries who had contributed, in the previous two years, to the progress of the European Union.

Perdigão was made a Commander of the Military Order of Saint James of the Sword in 1964, a Grand Officer of the same order in 1985 and was awarded posthumously the Grand Cross of the same order in 1990. She was also made a Commander of the Order of Prince Henry in 1983.

Four roads, streets or squares have been named after her in the Lisbon District.

An exhibition to celebrate the 100th anniversary of her birth was held at the Calouste Gulbenkian Foundation in 2023.

== Death ==
Perdigão died in Lisbon on 5 December 1989.
