= Ji.hlava International Documentary Film Festival =

Film festival in Jihlava, Czech Republic

- Jihlava IDFF Logo
- Location: Jihlava, Czech Republic
- Founded: 1997
- Most recent: 2025
- Awards: Opus Bonum; Testimonies; Czech Joy; Short Joy; Fascinations
- No. of films: 305 in 2025
- Festival date: Opening: 23 October 2026; Closing: 1 November 2026
- Website: ji-hlava.com

Current: 30th
- 31th 29th

Ji.hlava International Documentary Film Festival (Czech: Mezinárodní festival dokumentárních filmů Ji.hlava), also known as MFDF Ji.hlava or Ji.hlava IDFF, is a documentary film festival that takes place annually in the Czech city of Jihlava, typically in late October. The festival was established in 1997 by a group of high school students, led by Marek Hovorka, who has directed the festival since its inception. Since 2001, it has been organized by the Jihlava Association of Amateur Filmmakers, which rebranded as DOC.DREAM—the Association for the Support of Documentary Cinema—in 2015. Ji.hlava IDFF is a founding member of Doc Alliance, a coalition of seven European documentary film festivals.

During the 2022 event, over 86,000 visitors viewed films, with more than 36,000 attending screenings in cinemas and nearly 50,000 viewing films online. The festival featured 376 films in 2022, and over 1,000 film professionals participated in the Ji.hlava Industry Programme, which includes initiatives such as Emerging Producers.

The most recent edition of the event took place from 24 October to 2 November 2025.

== Program ==
=== Competition sections ===
The festival features six competition sections:

- Opus Bonum – Best World Documentary Film

In addition to the main award, jurors of Opus Bonum also recognize achievements in best cinematography, editing, sound design, and outstanding formats, including categories for best film essay, best debut, and best film from Central and Eastern Europe (Between the Seas Award).

- Czech Joy – Best Czech Documentary Film
- Fascinations – Best World Experimental Documentary Film
- Fascinations: Exprmntl.cz – Best Czech Experimental Documentary Film
- Short Joy – Best Short Documentary Film
- Testimonies – This section focuses on documentaries addressing politics, nature, and knowledge, and includes films with historical and political themes or ecological and environmental topics.

The festival annually nominates one film for pre-selection to the European Film Academy award for Best Documentary Film of the Year. Winners of the Short Joy award may also be eligible for pre-selection to the Documentary Short Subject category at the Academy Awards.

Opus Bonum Award for Best World Documentary Film
Year	Film title	Director	Country of origin
2007	731: Two Versions of Hell	James T. Hong	China, United States, Taiwan
2008	Iraqi Short Films	Mauro Andrizzi	Argentina
2009	Bassidji	Tamadon Mehran	Iran, Switzerland, France
2010	48	Susana de Sousa Dias	Portugal
2011	Lost Land	Pierre-Yves Vanderweerd	Belgium
2012	Kuichisan	Maiko Endo	Japan, United States
2013	The Uprising	Peter Snowdon	Belgium, United Kingdom
2014	I Am the People	Anna Roussillon	France
2015	Dead Slow Ahead	Mauro Herce	Spain, France
2016	Spectres Are Haunting Europe	Maria Kourkouta, Niki Giannari	France, Greece
2017	The Wall	Dmitry Bogolubov	Russia
2018	Vacancy	Alexandra Kandy Longuet	Belgium
2019	Fonja	Lina Zacher and collective	Madagascar, Germany
2020	White on White	Viera Čákanyová	Slovakia, Czech Republic
2021	Lines	Barbora Sliepková	Slovakia
2022	07:15 – Blackbird	Judith Auffray	France
2023	Ship	Elvis Lenić	Croatia
2024	Ms.President	Marek Šulík	Slovakia, Czech Republic

Between the Seas Award for Best Central and Eastern European Documentary Film
Year	Film title	Director	Country of origin
2003	66 Seasons	Peter Kerekes	Slovakia
2003	Sentiment	Tomáš Hejtmánek	Czech Republic
2004	The Ring	Angus Reid	Slovenia
2005	Snail Fortress	Deszo Zsigmond	Hungary
2006	All Day Together	Marcin Koszałka	Poland
2007	Artel	Simon Semtov, Sergei Loznitsa	Russia
2008	The Flower Bridge	Thomas Ciulei	Romania, Germany
2009	Border	Jaroslav Vojtek	Slovakia
2010	Autobiography of Nicolae Ceausescu	Andrei Ujică	Romania
2011	Bakhmaro	Salomé Jashi	Georgia, Germany
2012	Mirage	Srđan Keča	United Kingdom, Serbia
2013	Winter / Miracle	Gustavo Beck, Zeljka Sukova	Croatia, Denmark, Brazil
2014	We Come as Friends	Hubert Sauper	France, Austria
2015	Under the Sun	Vitaly Mansky	Czech Republic, Russia, Germany, North Korea
2016	The Dazzling Light of Sunset	Salomé Jashi	Georgia, Germany
2017	Opera About Poland	Piotr Stasik	Poland
2018	Timebox	Nora Agapi	Romania
2019	TEKSTY	Michał Marczak	Poland
2020	The Last of the Righteous	Khaled Jarrar	Palestine
2021	Sons of the Forest	Agustina San Martín	Argentina, Chile, United States
2022	Stepne	Julius Taminiau	The Netherlands

Short Joy competition for Best Short Film Awards
Year	Film title	Director	Country of origin
2024	Only if the Baby Cries...	Shadab Farooq	India

== Special sections ==
The festival also includes special sections dedicated to thematic selections and various styles of documentary filmmaking, such as:

- Spotlight – Features notable filmmakers or documentary movements.
- Retrospective – Showcases significant films from previous years or influential directors.
- Masterclasses – Educational sessions led by industry professionals.
- Theatrical Showings – Public screenings of selected films outside of the competition.
- New Visions Forum – A financing, co-production, and networking event with a focus on exploring critical societal, environmental, and historical issues.

== See also ==
- List of film festivals in the Czech Republic
