= František Listopad =

Czech poet, prose writer, essayist, theatre and television director

František Listopad (26 November 1921 – 1 October 2017) (born Jiří Synek, in Portugal known as Jorge Listopad) was a Czech poet, prose writer, essayist, theatre and television director, promoter of Czech literature and culture abroad, regarded as an expert on Central European thought and cultural output.

== Biography ==
František Listopad was born on 26 November 1921 in Prague and died in Lisbon on 1 October 2017. His nom de plume of Listopad is Czech for November, the month of his birth. After graduating from Jirásek Grammar School, he studied Aesthetics and Literary Science at the Faculty of Philosophy, Charles University. During the war he was a member of the illegal Freedom Movement („Hnutí za svobodu“), and his father and sister were imprisoned. He was awarded Czechoslovak, Portuguese, Yugoslav, and French military decorations.

He was the co-founder of the daily newspaper Mladá fronta. In 1947, he was the press attaché of the Czechoslovak Embassy in Paris and an editor of the Parisian weekly periodical Parallele 50. After February 1948 he was recalled, but remained in Paris.

He worked for ORTF until 1958, when he left for Portugal, where he lived for the rest of his life. He wrote poetry and short poetic fiction in Czech and essays and plays in Portuguese.

In 2007, he was awarded the literary prize by La fondation de la Charte 77.
