= Jacob Lagarto =

Brazilian rabbi

Jacob Lagarto was a South American rabbi and Talmudist of the 17th century; probably a son of Simon Lagarto of Amsterdam. He went to Brazil as a young man, and about 1680 was the Chacham of the Jews at Tamarica, Brazil. He was the author of a work entitled Ohel Yaakov or Tienda de Jacob.
