= António Lagarto =

Portuguese artist

António Lagarto GOIH is a Portuguese set and costume designer and artist.

== Biography ==
Lagarto lived in London through the seventies and eighties, having graduated at St. Martin's School of Art (sculpture) and the Royal College of Art (environmental media). He developed his activity between London, Lisbon and Paris. He was director of Teatro Nacional D. Maria II (Lisbon's national theatre) in 2005 and 2006, after being deputy director from 1989–1993. He was director of Festival Internacional de Teatro – FIT (Lisbon's International Theatre Festival) (1991–1995). Since 2007 he is in charge of the department of set and costume design at Lisbon's Escola Superior de Teatro e Cinema (theatre and cinema school).

Lagarto started his career in performance art and environment / installations. His work has spanned from installations to photography, film, illustration, graphics and interior design. In 1978 he initiated his professional activity in set and costume design. Between 1975 and 1981 he collaborated in several art and design projects with architect Nigel Coates.

His set and costume designs for theatre, dance, ballet and opera have been seen at the Opéra National de Paris, Opera di Torino, Teatro María Guerrero and Teatro de la Comedia in Madrid, at Teatro SESC/Vila Mariana in São Paulo, at Portuguese national theatres (Teatro Nacional de São Carlos Opera House, Teatro Nacional D. Maria II, Companhia Nacional de Bailado, Gulbenkian Ballet, Centro Cultural de Belém all in Lisbon, and Teatro Nacional de S. João in Porto), at Sadler's Wells Theatre in London, Theatre Royal and Traverse Theatre in Edinburgh, Théâtre national de la Colline in Paris, among others.

== Sample work ==
Lagarto's work has been exhibited at Serralves Museum (Porto), Luís Serpa Gallery (Lisbon), Art Net Gallery (London), Galleria Zona (Florence), among others. He was present at (P)Portugal 1990/2004, Architecture and Design, at Palazzo della Triennale (Milan 2004).

Some of his most emblematic designs were for Fausto, Fernando, Fragmentos., by Fernando Pessoa, directed by Ricardo Pais, at Teatro Nacional D. Maria II (Lisbon 1989) and for Hamlet a mais, by William Shakespeare, also directed by Ricardo Pais, at Teatro Nacional de S. João (Porto 2003). For the Opéra National de Paris (1997) he designed the sets for The Merry Widow, by Franz Lehár, directed by Jorge Lavelli, with Karita Matila in the title role. His latest costume and set designs were for Swan Lake, with Ana Lacerda and Carlos Acosta, choreographed by Mehmet Balkan, at Companhia Nacional de Bailado (National Ballet of Portugal), also shown at Teatro de Madrid (Madrid) and at Bangkok's Festival. In 2009 he designed Don Giovanni for Lisbon's Opera House Teatro Nacional S. Carlos, August in Osage, by Tracy Letts, for Lisbon's Teatro Nacional D. Maria II and the musical The Adding Machine for Teatro da Trindade.

In June 2015, he was made a grand-officer of the Portuguese Order of Prince Henry the Navigator (Ordem do Infante Dom Henrique).
