= Brazilian press =

History of the press in Brazil

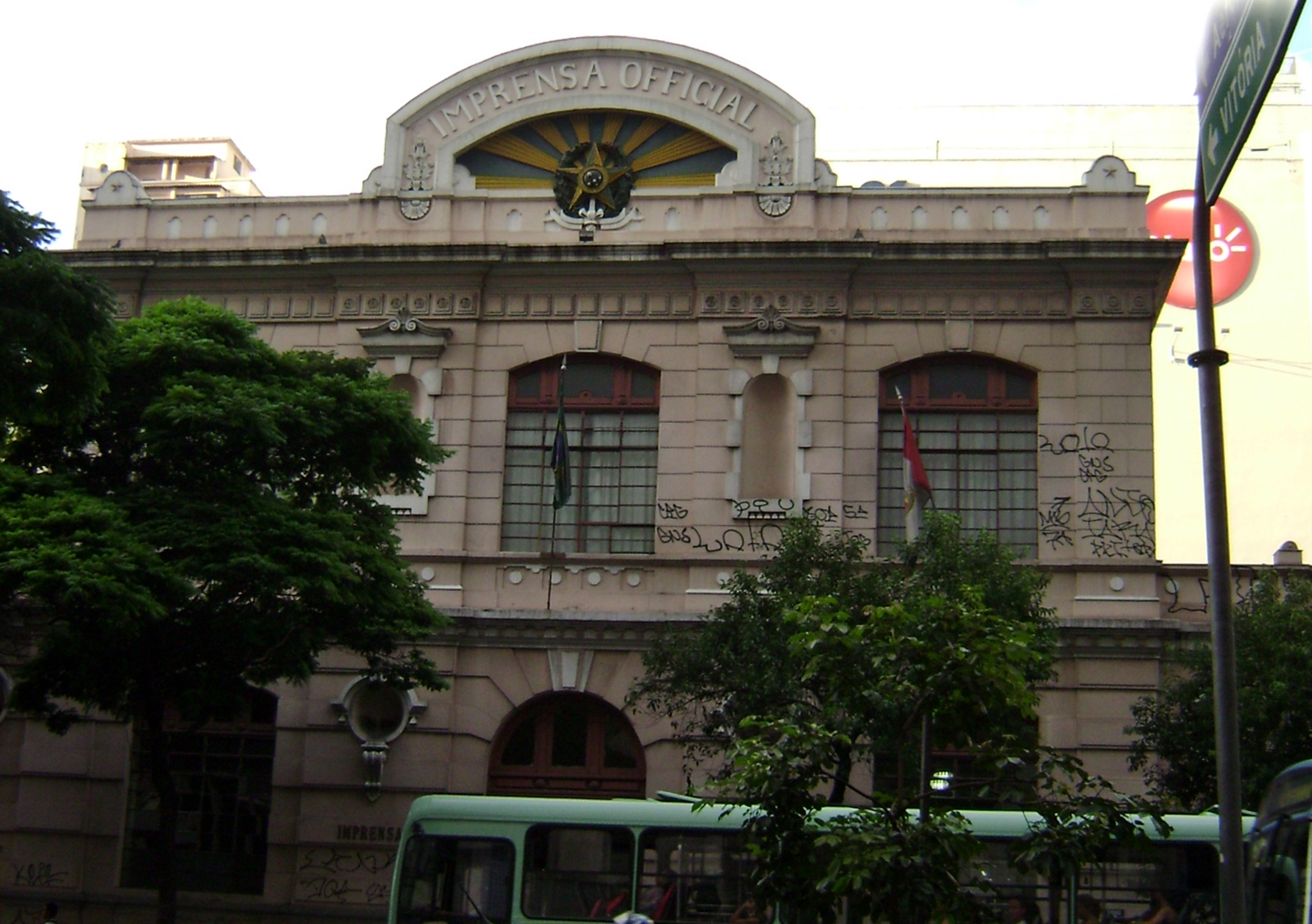
Imprensa Oficial, in Belo Horizonte.

The history of the press in Brazil begins in 1808 with the arrival of the Portuguese royal family in Colonial Brazil, when all forms of press activity were prohibited – including the publication of newspapers, books, or pamphlets. This was a peculiarity of Portuguese America, as press was present in other European colonies on the continent since the 16th century.

With the arrival of the royal family, the Royal Press (now Imprensa Nacional) was founded, where the first Brazilian newspaper, the Gazeta do Rio de Janeiro, was printed. (The Correio Braziliense is older, but it was printed in London.) Even with the press already established in the country, it did not develop rapidly and was primarily limited to government establishments and newspapers. Brazilian newspapers were few in number, and many did not publish regularly. Most newspapers and magazines in circulation were foreign.

Even later, during the Empire (1822–1889), public libraries were rare, except in major cities such as Rio, where the National Library stood out. The country had few bookstores, and books were printed in Europe, making them very expensive.

== Regional context and prehistory ==
The press in Brazil developed much later compared to neighboring countries in Spanish America. The historian and sociologist Sérgio Buarque de Holanda, in his book Raízes do Brasil, recounts that as early as 1535, books were printed in Mexico City. In 1539, Juan Pablos established his workshop in the city, becoming the first documented printer in the New World. From New Spain (the kingdom where Mexico City was located), the art of typography was taken to Lima, the capital of Peru. Authorization to establish a printing workshop in Lima was granted in 1584. According to an estimate, from the early 1500s to 1821, 11,625 works were published in Mexico City alone, while in Lima, from 1584 to 1824, 2,948 were published.

Only in 1747, when printing was already established in all major cities of Spanish America, did António Isidoro da Fonseca open what was perhaps the first printing workshop in Brazil, in the city of Rio de Janeiro, which was soon closed by royal order. A royal letter issued the same year ordered the owner to seize and return the "printing letters" to Portugal, stating:

[it is not convenient that in the State of Brazil] papers be printed at the present time, nor is it useful for printers to work in their trade where expenses are greater than in the Kingdom, from which the books and papers can be printed at the same time as the licenses from the Inquisition and my Overseas Council, without which the works cannot be printed or circulated

— Royal Letter of July 5, 1747

In addition to António Isidoro da Fonseca's endeavor, other unsuccessful attempts make up what can be called the prehistory of the Brazilian press:

There is a chance that typography was introduced in Brazil, in Pernambuco, by Count Maurice of Nassau in the mid-17th century, during the Dutch occupation of northeastern Brazil. It is known that printing presses and movable type were sent from Holland, and the typographer Pieter Janszoon died on the way to Brazil or shortly after arriving in the country.

Another attempt was made in the early 18th century in Recife, also without success. During the government of Francisco de Castro Morais, an unknown merchant set up a small press and printed some sermons and bills of exchange. Nothing remains of the production of this typography. We have information about this initiative thanks to a Royal Letter of June 8, 1706, which prohibits and confiscates printed materials.

— Brown University, O Código Brasiliense na John Carter Brown Library: Impressão Régia

== History ==
The Brazilian press officially began in Rio de Janeiro on May 13, 1808, with the creation of the Royal Press, now the Imprensa Nacional, by the regent prince Dom João. The printing machines, imported from England, had been brought amidst the escape of the royal family from Lisbon in 1807, by António de Araújo e Azevedo, the Count of Barca.

However, the press did not develop rapidly and was primarily limited to government establishments (such as the aforementioned National Press) and newspapers. The newspapers that survived for a long time were the Diário de Pernambuco (1825) and, in Rio de Janeiro, the Jornal do Commercio (1827).

Furthermore, during its first 13 years in the country, the press was heavily censored. There was censorship at three levels, so "anyone who wanted to publish something in Brazil had to go through a long process," according to historian Isabel Lustosa. With the decree of March 2, 1821, this prior censorship was abolished.

=== Gazeta ===
The Gazeta do Rio de Janeiro, the first newspaper published in national territory, began circulating on September 10, 1808, printed on machines brought from England. As the official organ of the Portuguese government, which had taken refuge in the American colony, the newspaper only published news favorable to the government.

=== Correio Braziliense ===
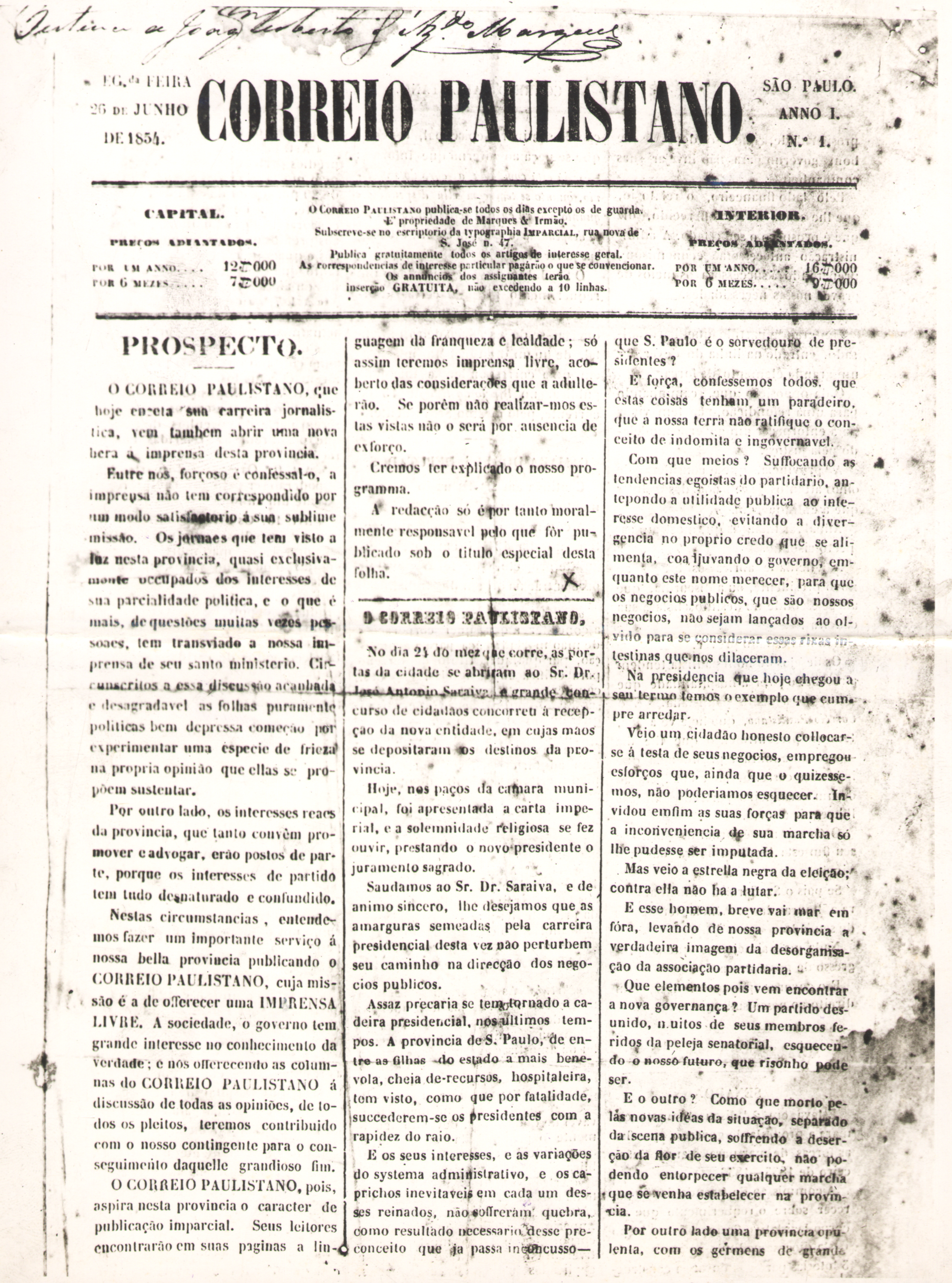
Cover of the first issue of the Jornal Correio Paulistano, the first daily newspaper in São Paulo, 1854. National Archives.

However, in the same year, a few months earlier, the exiled Hipólito José da Costa had launched the Correio Braziliense, the first Brazilian newspaper – albeit outside Brazil. The first issue of the newspaper is from June 1, 1808, but it only arrived in Rio de Janeiro in October, where it had a great impact on the more enlightened sectors of society, although it was banned and confiscated by the government. Until 1820, only the Gazeta (and magazines printed at the Royal Press) had a license to circulate. In 1821, with the end of the prohibition, the Diário do Rio de Janeiro was launched.

While the official newspaper reported "the health status of all the princes of Europe, (...) birthdays, odes, and panegyrics of the reigning family," the exiled newspaper engaged in politics. Although (contrary to popular belief) it did not advocate for Brazilian independence and sometimes had a conservative political stance, the Correio Braziliense was created to criticize "the defects of the administration of Brazil," in the words of its creator, and acknowledged its "doctrinal character rather than informative."

=== Censorship ===
Everything that was published in the Royal Press (Rio de Janeiro had no other printing press until 1821) was subject to a committee of three people tasked with "monitoring that nothing be printed against religion, government, and good morals." The prohibition of the press (including the destruction of printing presses) and prior censorship (established even before the first edition of the Gazeta) were justified by the fact that the general rule of the press at that time was not what is known today as news reporting but rather doctrinal, capable of "influencing public opinion," as the Correio Braziliense intended, and spreading its ideas among opinion-makers – essentially ideological propaganda.

Prior censorship was abolished on August 28, 1821, as a result of a decision by the Constitutional Courts of Lisbon in defense of public freedoms (putting an end to three centuries of censorship in Portugal). The personality of D. Pedro II, who was averse to persecutions, guaranteed an atmosphere of broad freedom of expression – a level not seen in any Latin American republic, thanks to the authoritarian caudillos who alternated power there. Freedom of the press was already guaranteed even by the granted Constitution of 1824. Bernardo Joffily writes: "Each current has its spokesperson," but still, "there are apolitical organs: the Diário do Rio de Janeiro (the first daily newspaper in the country, 1821–1878) doesn't even report on the Cry of Ipiranga. But the rule is engaged, doctrinal press."

The Frenchman Max Leclerc, who went to Brazil as a correspondent to cover the beginning of the republican regime, described the journalistic landscape in 1889:

The press in Brazil is a faithful reflection of the social state born out of the paternal and anarchic government of D. Pedro II: on the one hand, a few very prosperous newspapers, with powerful and sophisticated material organization, living primarily on advertising, organized primarily as a commercial enterprise, aiming to penetrate all segments and expand the circle of their readers to increase the value of their advertising and to exert their influence on shaping public opinion. ... Around them, a multicolored multitude of party newspapers that, far from being profitable businesses, survive on subsidies from those parties, a group, or a politician, and are only read if the person who supports them is prominent or feared.

Indeed, party newspapers or those spontaneously created and maintained by activists lack institutional organization and journalistic professionalism. During the most fervent moments of the republican campaign (1870–1878 and 1886–1889), dozens of ephemeral newspapers (each consisting of no more than 4 pages) appeared but did not last more than a few months.

=== Newspapers of the Empire ===
Among the Rio de Janeiro newspapers during the imperial era were, of primary importance, Gazeta de Noticias and O Paiz, the largest at that time and the ones that survived the longest, until the Vargas Era. The others included Diario de Noticias, Correio do Povo, Cidade do Rio, Diario do Commercio, Tribuna Liberal, some newspapers prior to 1889 but with a strong republican campaign, such as A Republica, and the caricature and satire magazines: Revista Illustrada, O Mequetrefe, O Mosquito, and O Bezouro. Others included Jornal do Commercio and Gazeta da Tarde.

In 1831, the year of Dom Pedro I's abdication, 48 different newspapers emerged in Rio de Janeiro, most of which were amateur and had low circulation, created with the aim of propagating the ideals of small groups or even a single person.

=== Iconography ===
Caricaturist, illustrator, journalist Ângelo Agostini is among the most prominent personalities of the Brazilian press. In a time when photography was still rare—and expensive—the illustrator had the undeniable power to construct the visual imagery of society. Thus, the "Emperor Cabeça-de-Caju" or the chubby prime minister with an air of haughtiness are what the population—and here even the illiterate masses enter—will consume and be guided by. A symbolic iconography of politics in the late Empire was created.

The Revista Illustrada was truly innovative. The lithographed illustrations aimed for both perfection and expressiveness. The magazine also innovated with "interactive" layout, with illustrations in the header, frame, etc. It was published weekly and had national distribution.

During its continuous 22-year publication, the Revista Illustrada became ingrained in the national daily life (cf. Werneck Sodré) and inspired a generation of satirical magazines. Although slightly earlier, they belong to the same period: O Mosquito, O Besouro (both by Bordalo Pinheiro, a Portuguese immigrant and friend of Agostini), and O Mequetrefe.

== Trust in the Brazilian press ==
Newsrooms have modernized, abandoning typewriters and starting to use computers. Furthermore, new technologies have given news a new platform: the internet. From then on, doubts arose as to whether printed newspapers would continue to exist or gradually disappear. However, according to the Brazilian Media Research of 2016, the most trusted medium by the population is still the printed newspaper. More than half of the survey respondents who claimed to read newspapers (59% of 4,665 people) trust the news brought by this medium often or always. Radio comes in second place and television in third in terms of trust. 57% of the survey respondents who claimed to listen to the radio always or often trust the news broadcast through this medium. Likewise, 54% of the respondents who claimed to watch TV always or often trust the information they watch.

The fourth most reliable source is magazines; the fifth is websites; the sixth is social media; and lastly, blogs.

The research shows that websites, social media, and blogs have not yet established themselves as reliable sources of information, despite the increase in internet consumption in the country. While more than half of the Brazilians who frequently read newspapers (59%) stated in the survey that they always or often trust the news brought by this medium, only 20% of the interviewed internet users said they always or often trust news published on websites, 14% on social media, and only 11% on blogs.

== Black press ==
The black press emerged in the 19th century when some newspapers were founded in Rio de Janeiro, all in 1833, specifically aimed at denouncing racism and social inequality. All of them had a short lifespan, and new periodicals began to be created only in the late century. At the beginning of the 20th century, there was an explosion of magazines, booklets, and newspapers produced by and directed to black people, seeking to regain their dignity, identity, history, and culture, highlighting the role of black personalities in Brazilian society, proposing the deconstruction of the ideology of racial democracy, and aiming to form a new collective consciousness and a new social paradigm. The black press has been, since its inception, one of the most important and combative expressions of the Brazilian black movement.

Despite its importance for a large population and its social impact, according to Isabel Cristina da Rosa, the black press still remains on the margins of general studies on the history of the Brazilian press and among national communication theorists. She adds: "It is imperative to critically reflect on the magnitude of this suppression – except for rare exceptions and brief mentions such as Bahia (1972), Melo (1972), and Werneck (1994) – which has served to perpetuate racism and the prevalence of white supremacy in the thought and studies of communication, press, and journalism in Brazil. Or about epistemicide as an instrument of racial domination, as discussed by black philosopher Sueli Carneiro (2005)."

== See also ==
- History of the book in Brazil
- Black press in Brazil

== Bibliography ==
- BAHIA, Juarez. Jornal, História e Técnica, vol. I – História da Imprensa Brasileira [Newspaper, History, and Technique, vol. I – History of the Brazilian Press]. São Paulo: Ática, 1990, 4th edition.
- BARBOSA, Marialva. Os Donos do Rio – Imprensa, Poder e Público (1880–1920) [The Owners of Rio – Press, Power, and Public (1880–1920)]. Rio de Janeiro: Vício de Leitura, 2000.
- CAPELATO, Maria Helena R.. Imprensa e História no Brasil [Press and History in Brazil]. São Paulo: Contexto/EdUSP, 1988.
- IPANEMA, Marcelo de & IPANEMA, Cybelle de. "Estabelecimento da Tipografia e origens do Jornalismo no Brasil" [Establishment of Typography and Origins of Journalism in Brazil]. in: Revista Brasileira de Comunicação [Brazilian Journal of Communication]. Brasília: March and June 1968.
- MEDEIROS, Benicio (2009). A rotativa parou! Os últimos dias da Última Hora de Samuel Wainer (in Portuguese). Rio de Janeiro: Civilização Brasileira. ISBN 978-85-200-0940-6.
- MELLO E SOUZA, Cláudio. Impressões do Brasil [Impressions of Brazil]. São Paulo: Grupo Machline, 1986.
- MELO, José Marques de (org.). Imprensa Brasileira – personagens que fizeram história [Brazilian Press – Characters Who Made History]. São Paulo: Imprensa Oficial do Estado de São Paulo and Universidade Metodista de São Paulo, 2005.
- RIBEIRO, Ana Paula Goulart. Imprensa e História no Rio de Janeiro dos Anos 50 [Press and History in Rio de Janeiro in the 1950s]. PhD thesis. Rio de Janeiro: ECO-UFRJ, 2000.
- RIZZINI, Carlos. O Livro, o Jornal e a Tipografia no Brasil [The Book, the Newspaper, and Typography in Brazil]. Rio de Janeiro: Kosmos, 1945.
- WERNECK SODRÉ, Nelson. História da Imprensa no Brasil [History of the Press in Brazil]. Rio de Janeiro: Civilização Brasileira, 1966.
