= Hipólito da Costa =

Brazilian journalist (1774–1823)

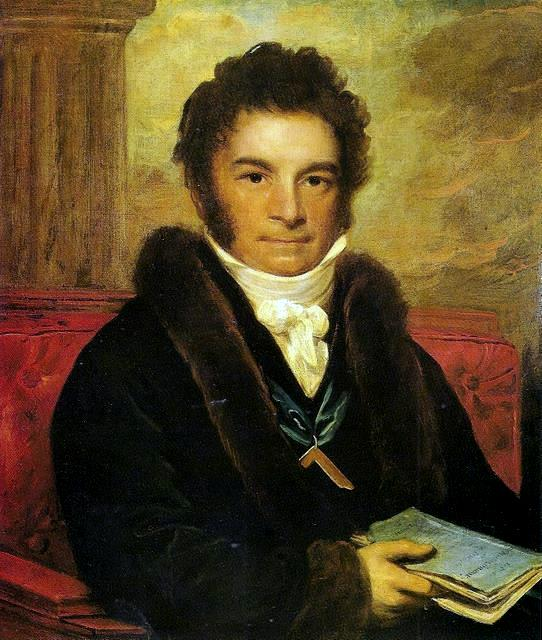
- A painting of Costa, by an unknown artist
- Born: Hipólito José da Costa Pereira Furtado de Mendonça; 13 August 1774; Colónia do Sacramento, State of Brazil (present-day Uruguay)
- Died: 11 September 1823 (aged 49); London, England
- Education: University of Coimbra
- Occupations: Journalist, diplomat (Note: He did not have permission to act as a diplomat, but he acted as a diplomat de facto during his trip on the United States.)
- Spouse: Mary Ann Troughton da Costa (m. 1817)
- Children: 4 (Note: One of his children, Félix José da Costa, was adopted after Mary Anne Lyons died without a husband.)
- Relatives: José Saturninino da Costa Pereira (brother)
- Writing career
- Notable works: Correio Braziliense (1808–1822); Narrativa da Perseguição (1811); Diário de Minha Viagem para a Filadélfia (1955) (Note: Posthumous publication.)

Hipólito José da Costa Pereira Furtado de Mendonça (13 August 1774 – 11 September 1823) was a Brazilian journalist and diplomat considered to be the "father of Brazilian press".

Hipólito was born on a rich family in Colônia do Sacramento. After the territory was annexed to the Spanish Empire, he moved to Capão do Leão, where Pelotas is located nowadays. He was educated by his uncles and left to study in Lisbon, at University of Coimbra. There, he became acquainted with Rodrigo de Sousa Coutinho and went on a diplomatic mission to the United States, where he was initiated in the Freemasonry.

Back in the Kingdom of Portugal, he was employed on the Impressão Régia, the Court's journal, and went to England to buy equipment for the press, but on his way back he was arrested by the Portuguese Inquisition for engaging with Freemasonry and liberal ideas. Three years later, his fellow freemasons helped him escape prison and he moved to London, where he was under the protection of Prince Augustus Frederick, Duke of Sussex. He maintained his involvement with Freemasonry and in 1808 inaugurated the journal Correio Braziliense, that he used to criticize the reign of Dom João VI. The periodical was forbitten to circulate in the United Kingdom of Portugal, Brazil and the Algarves, but it would commonly be smuggled inside of the Kingdom of Brazil and it was read even by important authorities.

He is considered an important historical figure to Brazil, influencing the Independence movement. Even though it was not published on Brazilian soil, Correio Braziliense is considered to be the first Brazilian journal. He received many homages after his death. He is the patron of the 17th chair of the Brazilian Academy of Letters, the National Day of the Press is celebrated on the day Correio Braziliense began circulating and his name was added to the Book of Heroes of the Homeland by José Alencar Gomes da Silva.

== Biography ==
=== First years ===
Costa was born in Colônia do Sacramento, Captaincy of São Pedro do Rio Grande do Sul, now part of Uruguay, to alferes Félix da Costa Furtado de Mendonça and Ana Josefa Pereira. His brother was José Saturnino da Costa Pereira, who would be a senator of the Empire of Brazil and commander of the Brazilian Army. Although they had converted to Christianity, his family, the da Costas, came from a long line of Sephardic Jews who were active in Portugal, England and the West Indies.

In 1777, the Cisplatina region was annexed to the Spanish Empire due the First Treaty of San Ildefonso. His family had to move out and after a short stay in Buenos Aires, they have stablished themselves in Capão do Leão, where Pelotas is located nowadays. Costa and his brothers were educated by two of their uncles, both being priests. His main educator was Pedro Pereira Fernandes de Mesquita, the "Doctor Priest".

=== Education in Europe ===
In 1793, Costa went to Lisbon to study at the University of Coimbra. His uncles had written several recommendation letters, one destined to Rodrigo de Sousa Coutinho. There, he became personal friends with the Prince Augustus Frederick, Duke of Sussex. In 1798, he graduated as bachelors in Mathematics, Philosophy and Law.

=== Travel through the United States ===
Three months after his graduation, Costa was sent by the then-Portuguese prime minister Rodrigo de Sousa Coutinho on a diplomatic mission to the United States to research "examples to be followed" by the Lusitan colony. He studied agriculture techniques for the tropical climate, mining, economy and industrial advancements. Even though he did not have permission to act as a diplomat he had to be a diplomat de facto, as the Portuguese representant, Cipriano Ribeiro Freire, was absent on several occasions. During his trip he met personalities such as Thomas Jefferson and John Adams.

During his stay in Maryland and Virginia, he paid special attention to the tobacco plantations. He also travelled to New Spain to observe the gold and silver mines and the extraction of the scale insect from the plants, but he was moneyless and instead moved to Philadelphia. There, he was initiated into Freemasonry on 12 March 1799 on the Lodge of George Washington.

He wrote an account of his trip, named Diário de Minha Viagem para a Filadélfia (Diary of My Trip to Philadelphia), but it would be only published in 1955.

=== Arrest ===
Costa lived in the U.S. up until 1800. He then returned to the Kingdom of Portugal and worked at the typography of Arco do Cego. In 1801, he was named as Literary Director of the Junta of Impressão Régia, the official press of the Crown. During his term, he published two scientific books, Descripção da Arvore Assucareira, e da Sua Utilidade e Cultura (Description of the Sugar Tree and Its Utility and Culture) and Descripção de Huma Maquina Para Tocar a Bomba á Bordo dos Navios Sem o Trabalho de Homens (Description of a Machine for Operating the Pump Inside of Ships Without the Work of Men). He's also translated several scientific works to Portuguese, including A Memoir Concerning the Disease of Goitre, as it Prevails in Different Parts of North-America, by Benjamin Smith Barton, and A Concise and Authentic History of the Bank of England, by E.F. Thomas Fortune. He was sent to England on an official trip to buy equipment for the press and for the reform of the Royal Library. During his trip, he also made contact with the masonic lodges of England and met names such as Simón Bolívar and Francisco de Miranda. He's also acquired a typography for Rodrigo de Sousa Coutinho, planned to be used in his Secretary of State for Foreign Business and War. It was transported to Brazil by the ship Meduza, but it was never used.

In 1802, when he returned to Portugal, he was arrested by the Portuguese Inquisition, by order of Pina Manique. He was first accused of not having a passport, and later of spreading Masonic ideas through Europe. However, three years later, he was able to escape prison and fled to Spain, disguised as a lackey. From Spain, he went to Gibraltar and then returned to England, where he received protection of Prince Augustus Frederick. Settling down in the city of London, Costa lived off with the patronage of Augustus Frederick and other Freemasons. He also gave some classes, worked with translation and bought some shares of the Bank of Scotland.

In 1811, he published Narrativa da Perseguição (Narrative of the Persecution), a book about his time on jail and the persecution the Freemasonry suffered on the hands of the Portuguese Inquisition.

=== Freemasonry ===
After his establishment in England, Hipólito became a notorious Freemason. He joined two masonic lodges under the auspices of the Premier Grand Lodge of England; the Lodge of the Nine Muses (1807) and then the Lodge of Antiquity (1808). In 1813, the Duke of Sussex made him his assistant on the Freemasonry during his term as Grand Master. He was named Provincial Grand Master of the Rutland County. After he reached the 33d. degree, he was named on 13 October 1819 by the Supreme Council of France as one of the founders of the Supreme Council of England, Ireland and Domains and became its first Secretary. On 2 December 1819, he was named an honorary member of the Supreme Council of France.

=== Correio Braziliense ===
Costa then founded in 1808 what would be the first Brazilian journal: the Correio Braziliense ou Armazém Literário (Brazilian Post or Literary Warehouse). The journal was not published on Brazilian soil, but it was released three months before the Gazeta do Rio de Janeiro, the official press of the Court. Through it, Costa would spread Liberal ideas. However, the Portuguese ambassador in London, Domingos António de Sousa Coutinho, was an extreme combatant of Costa's journal, and would create one journal himself, entitled O Investigador Portuguez em Inglaterra (The Portuguese Investigator in England), which ran from 1811 to 1819. Many other journals which fought Correio Braziliense were created.

Correio Braziliense soon became very popular and influent on the Portuguese Empire, including on the State of Brazil and later the Kingdom of Brazil. it was formally forbidden by the Crown thrice, on 1811, 1812 and 1817. The journal nonetheless was smuggled inside of Brazil and read including by the local authorities.

In March 1817, during the Pernambucan revolution, Hipólito was invited to be the ambassador in London in name of the Provisional Government of the Republic, but he refused.

Costa closed his journal in 1822, after the independence of Brazil, for considering his objectives were met.

=== Death ===
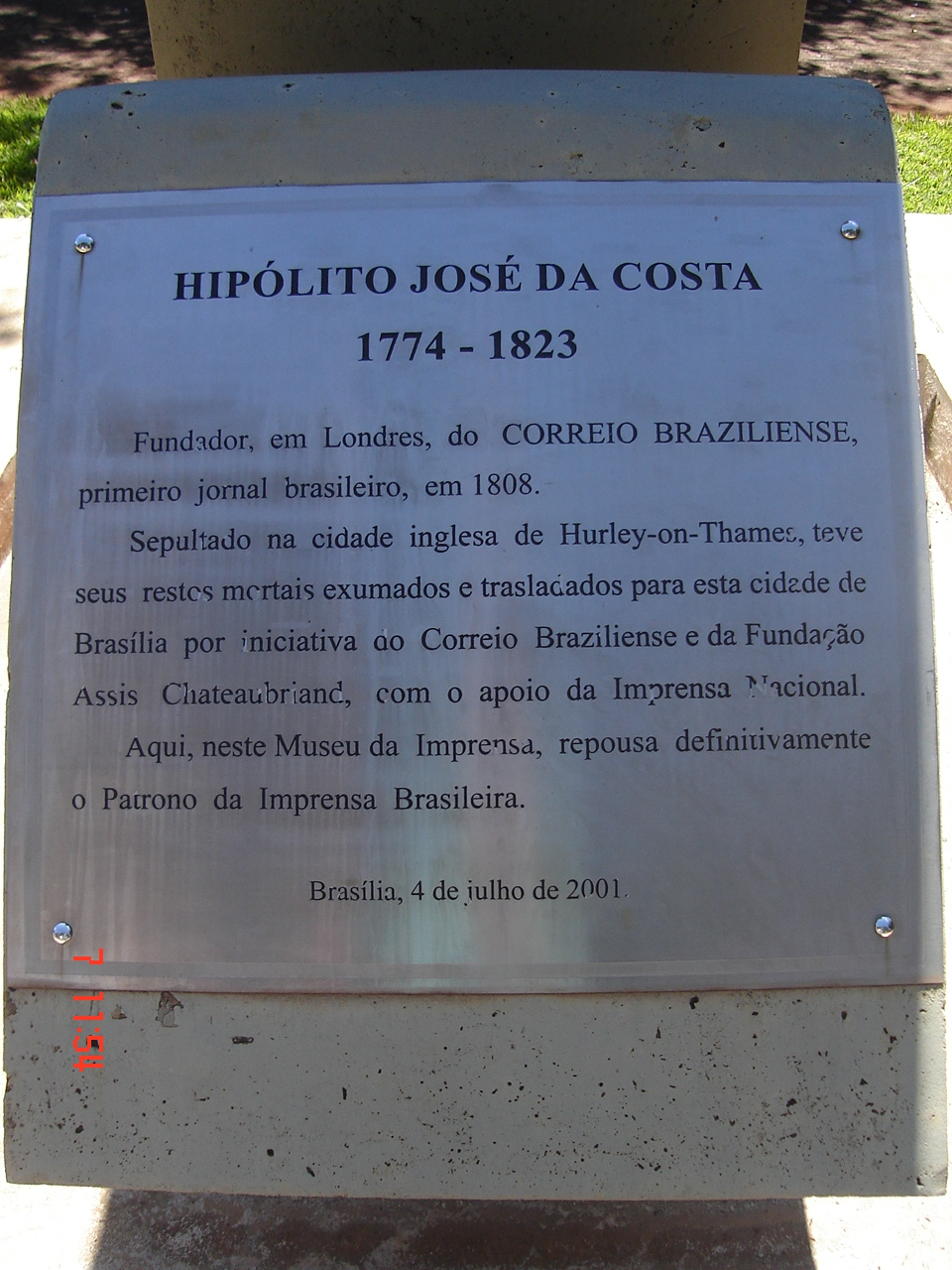
Costa's tombstone at the Museu da Imprensa Nacional

Costa died on 11 September 1823 due an intestinal infection. Nine days later, he was proclaimed consul of Brazil in England by Dom Pedro I. He was buried in the church of Saint Mary the Virgin, in Hurley, Berkshire.

His graveyard was discovered in 1955 by the effords of the diplomat Gastão Nothman, being notified by the first time by Carlos Rizzini on 29 October 1955 on the magazine O Cruzeiro. The recovery of his body was for a long time an objective of the owner of Diários Associados Assis Chateaubriand. In 1999, Márcio Cotrim, executive director of Fundação Assis Chateaubriand, retook the dipolmatic effords and on 21 March 2001 his body was exumed by the reverend Roy Taylor. The ceremony was observed by 50 people, including the journalist Paulo Cabral de Araújo, the diplomat Sérgio Amaral, the mayor of Hurley John Webb and Hipólito's descendant of the 6th generation Maria Beatriz de Arruda Campos. On 4 July, he was officially buried in the gardens of the Museu da Imprensa Nacional, in a ceremony observed by Marco Maciel and Paulo Cabral de Araújo.

== Personal life ==
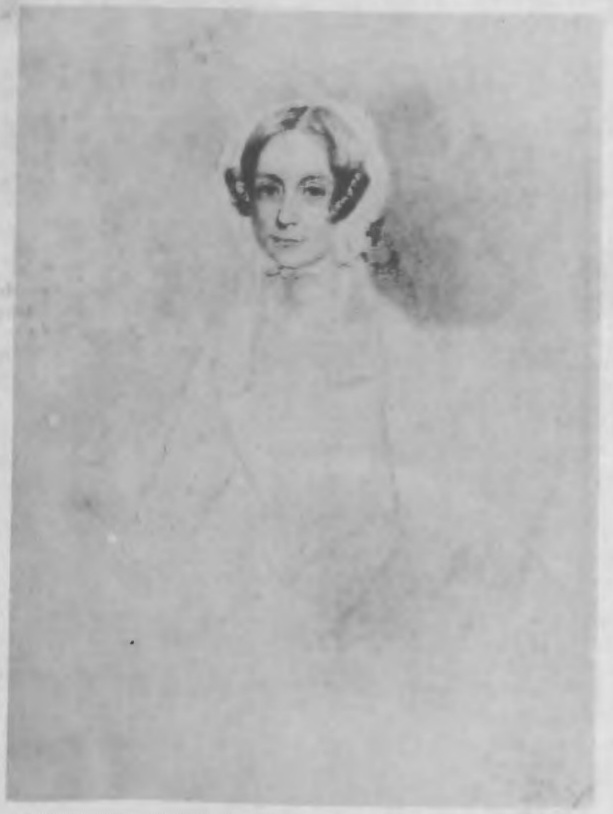
Hipólito's wife, Mary Ann Troughton da Costa

Hipólito assumed the paternity of Félix José da Costa. His mother, Mary Anne Lyons, was the daughter of his friend W. Lewis, owner of the first typography Correio Braziliense was printed. Hipólito adopted the boy after she died without a husband, making some speculate that he had a bastard child. Because of Hipólito's upcoming official marriage, Félix was sent to Brazil to be educated by his brother, José Saturnino. Félix married with a Brazilian of unknown name and had a son, João Manuel Simões da Costa, thus starting Hipólito's descendency in Brazil.

On 7 July 1817, Hipólito married Mary Ann Troughton, daughter of Richard Troughton and Elizabeth Ap-Rice. They had three children, Augusta Carolina, Anne Shirley and Augusto Frederico, named after the Duke of Sussex. His two daughters married respectivetly Adolphus Charles Troughton and Whitworth Porter, thus starting his descendency in England. Augusto Frederico never married.

== Opinions ==
Hipólito da Costa was a liberal. He was a militant for the cause of a Lusitan empire headquartered in Brazil, governed by a constitutional monarchy and with a bicameral Assembly elected by the people. He saw the transfer of the Portuguese court to Brazil with good eyes and claimed that Dom João VI would have a great influence for being the only monarch in the Americas.

He defended the Portuguese Crown should promote a reform of the education system, the transparency of the public finances, the freedom of press, the creation of a national post system, the adoption a single Law for all the Captaincies, abolish slavery, incentive the European immigration to Brazil as a workforce, put the Military under the control of the civil society and the transfer of the court to the countryside, coining the name "Brasília" that would later be adopted as the new capital of Brazil in 1960. But as the Ministers just adopted the old system used in Portugal, he harshly criticized the Government, often comparing it to what was done in England.

With the lack of action from the Court, Hipólito started supporting several revolutions inside of the United Kingdom of Portugal, Brazil and the Algarves. In 1817, he initially showed some degree of sympathy to the Pernambucan revolution, but he later disqualified their leaders and the aspirations of creating a republic. After the suffocation of the revolution, he affirmed that it was "criminal and imprudent". Later, he would change his position from a "reformist" perspective to a "Brazilian patriot" one, defending the Liberal Revolution of 1820 and the Independence of Brazil. Even though his adherence to the independence movement was not immediate, he saw it as "an unwanted, but necessary fact" and defended the creation of a United Constitutional Kingdom.

== Homages ==
Correio Braziliense is considered the first Brazilian journal by Brazilian historians and one of the first Portuguese journals by Portuguese historians. Hipólito himself is considered an important historical figure to Brazil even by his critics, including Nelson Werneck Sodré and Antonio Candido. The historian Francisco Adolpho de Varnhagen has said that "he did more for the independence of Brazil than Benjamin Franklin did for the independence of the United States". According to Baron Homem de Mello, Correio Braziliense has educated the ones responsible for the independence. Amongst those that have written biographies of Hipólito, are Adolfo Varnhargen, Baron Homem de Mello, Carlos Rizzini, Mecenas Dourado, Barbosa Lima Sobrinho, Riopardense de Macedo, Cláudio Moreira Bento, Raul Quevedo, Paulo Xavier, Isabel Lustosa, José Marques de Melo, Antonio Hohlfeldt and Terezinha de Castro.

In 1897, he became the patron of the 17th chair of the Brazilian Academy of Letters by the choice of its founder Sílvio Romero.

Assis Chateaubriand considered Hipólito as an important Brazilian cultural reference and a cosmopolitan citizen. In 1942, he named an airplane in São Paulo as "Hipólito da Costa". On 21 April 1960, he named his journal "Correio Braziliense" as a homage to Hipólito da Costa. The journal was inaugurated together with Brasília, the new capital of Brazil built during the presidency of Juscelino Kubitschek. Hipólito supported the creation of a Brazilian capital on the countryside and coined the name "Brasília".

Hipólito is also considered an important historical figure in Rio Grande do Sul. In 1973, the sesquicentennial of his death was celebrated, and in 1974 the bicentenary of his birth was celebrated. During the celebrations, the historian Francisco Riopardense de Macedo won the contest of best monography with his thesis Hipólito da Costa e o Universo da Liberdade (Hipólito da Costa and the Univese of Freedom).

The Museu de Comunicação Social Hipólito José da Costa, in Porto Alegre, is named after him. It was created on 10 September 1974, on the government of Euclides Triches, during the celebrations of the bicentenary of his death. It was formalized by the Decree nº 24,366, from December 1975. The museum was idealized by Sérgio Dillenburg, with the support of Associação Riograndense de Imprensa.

Through the Law nº 9,831, from 13 September 1999, the president Fernando Henrique Cardoso and the minister of justice José Carlos Dias changed the date of the National Day of the Press to 1 June as a homage of the beginning of the circulation of Correio Braziliense. Since Estado Novo, the date was celebrated on 10 September, the beginning of the circulation of Gazeta do Rio de Janeiro, the first journal published on Brazilian soil. The project was created by Nelson Marchezan (PSDB-RS), with support of Associação Riograndense de Imprensa, Fundação Assis Chateaubriand, Loja Maçônica Província de São Pedro, the historian Claúdio Moreira Bento, the journalist Raul Quevedo and the professor Alberto André. In 1996, several of the involved released the Manifest to the Nation, debunking the thesis that Gazeta do Rio de Janeiro was the first Brazilian Journal.

Hipólito's name was included on the Book of Heroes of the Homeland through the Law nº 12,283, from 5 July 2010, by the vice-president José Alencar Gomes da Silva and the minister of culture João Luiz Silva Ferreira.

== Notes ==
Preceded by New creation	Brazilian Academy of Letters - Patron of the 17th chair	Succeeded by Sílvio Romero (founder)
