= Correio Braziliense (1808) =

Portuguese political monthly magazine (1808–1822)

Correio Braziliense ou Armazém Literário
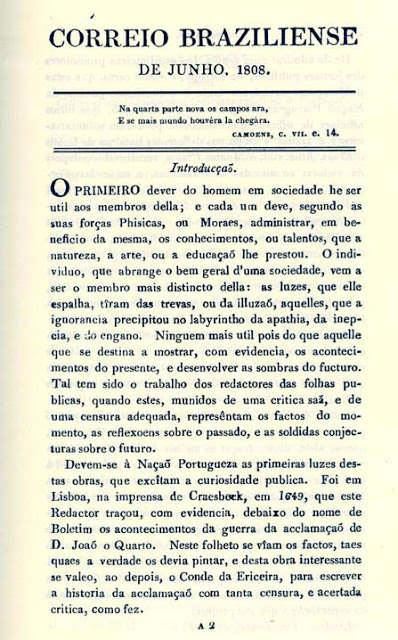
- First page of Correio Braziliense from June 1808
- Frequency: Monthly
- Founder: Hipólito da Costa
- First issue: 1 June 1808
- Final issue Number: December 1822; 175
- Country: Portuguese Empire
- Based in: London, United Kingdom of Great Britain and Ireland
- Language: Portuguese

Correio Braziliense ou Armazém Literário (the Brazilian Press or Literary Warehouse) was a Portuguese political magazine created in 1808 by Hipólito da Costa in London. The periodical is considered one of the most important of its time. It was critical of the Portuguese Crown and advocated for liberalism, advocating for a constitutional monarchy on the Lusitan world. Despite being banned by royal censors, it was very influential in the United Kingdom of Portugal, Brazil and the Algarves. It ceased publication in 1822, after the Independence of Brazil. Correio Braziliense is considered as the first Brazilian magazine and Hipólito da Costa as the "father of Brazilian press".

== History ==
Correio Braziliense was started in London in 1808 by Hipólito da Costa, months after the transfer of the Portuguese court to Brazil. He had just fled prison in Lisbon for his involvement with freemasonry and liberal ideas, and had established himself in London under the protection of Prince Augustus Frederick, Duke of Sussex. The first issue was published on 21 April, and Hipólito was the only writer of the magazine. The periodical was initially printed on the typography of W. Lewis, on Paternoster-Row street.

Correio Braziliense was censored by several authorities. On 24 March 1809, the Royal censorship published a warning about its content and days later confiscated 13 volumes. In December 1810, Diogo de Sousa, governor of the Captaincy of São Pedro do Rio Grande do Sul, revoked the permission of a merchant's house to read the periodical. In 1811, Dom João VI sent orders to Desembargo do Paço prohibiting the circulation of the periodical in the United Kingdom of Portugal, Brazil and the Algarves. On 17 June 1817, the prohibition was renewed.

Other periodicals were created with the objective of countering the Correio Braziliense, such as Abelha do Meio Dia (Midday Bee) (1809), Reflexões sobre o Correio Braziliense (Reflexions about Correio Braziliense) (1809), and Exame dos Artigos Históricos e Políticos Que Se Contêm Na Collecção Periódica Intitulada Correio Braziliense, ou Armazém Literário, no que Pertence Somente ao Reyno de Portugal (Exams of the Historical and Political Articles Contained in the Periodical Collection Called Correiro Braziliense, ou Armazém Literário, That Belongs Only to the Kingdom of Portugal) (1810). Domingos António de Sousa Coutinho created O Investigador Portuguez em Inglaterra, ou Jornal Literário, Político &, C. (The Portuguese Investigator in England, or Periodical of Politics, Literature & S.) (1811) to debunk Correio Braziliense's thesis, as the magazine constantly criticized the diplomat. Despite their rivalry, Hipólito had praised the periodical several times, especially the texts of Bernardo José Abrantes e Castro and Vicente Pedro Nolasco, but he especially disliked José de Agostinho Macedo. Some magazine had a good relationship with Correio Braziliense, especially Jornal de Coimbra.

Costa closed his magazine in 1822, after the independence of Brazil, considering that his original objectives had been met.

== Content ==
Correio Braziliense was a monthly magazine with 72 to 140 pages on average, with some editions containing more than 200 pages. The magazine was published in an octavo format, similar to a book. The editions counted the pages according to where the last edition had ended. For example, the first edition of Correio Braziliense ended on page 80, and the second edition began on page 81. The page count was restarted after the end of a volume, which usually happened at the end of a semester. The periodical published opinion journalism and its tone was considered "direct and ironical".

It was divided into four main sections: Politics, Commerce and Arts, Literature and Sciences and Miscellaneous, that was further subdivided into Correspondence and Reflexions.

Hipólito used Correio Braziliense to express many of his political views. He strongly advocated in favour of liberalism and utilitarianism, with his views being influenced by the Age of Enlightenment.

=== Model of government ===
Correio Braziliense harshly criticized the absolute monarchism of Dom João VI. Despite that, the magazine distanced itself from the "radical ideas" of the French Revolution, advocating for something between both ends of the political spectrum. It advocated for the union of the Kingdoms of Portugal and Brazil in a constitutional monarchy based on Great Britain's model. Hipólito was also inspired by the United States, but he believed its constitution should be adapted to fit into a monarchy.

The new Lusitan kingdom should be represented by a bicameral parliament, based on the French Chamber of Deputies created by the Charter of 1814. The chamber would also have the power of veto over royal decisions. The king would be the main representative of the executive power, also having limited influence over the legislative power. Hipólito was inspired by the Constitution of the United Kingdom and between 1809 and 1810, Correio Braziliense published seven articles comparing it with the Portuguese Government. He has also criticized the Constitution of Cádiz for not implementing bicameralism.

In September 1822, Hipólito published his own model of constitution, the "Project of a Political Constitution of Brazil", as a critique of the Portuguese Constitution of 1822, that implemented unicameralism. The project was well received by some, such as friar Francisco de Sampaio, but his enemy, Frei Caneca, affirmed the text was not of Hipólito's authorship, being supposedly sent to him to be published in London.

=== Economy and slavery ===
Correio Braziliense was aligned with the economic liberalism of Adam Smith. Between 1816 and 1820, Hipólito published several articles about Jean Charles Léonard de Sismondi's ideas, including a Portuguese translation of his book Nouveaux principes d'économie politique (1819). The magazine criticized the monopolist and mercantilist economic approach of Rodrigo de Sousa Coutinho, even after the Decree of the Opening of Ports for Friendly Nations. Correio Braziliense was a strong advocate against slavery. It suggested the gradual abolishment through the implementation of modern agricultural machinery and European immigration. He also supported the Chinese immigration to Brazil for considering China an industrialized country with fine arts and customs. In his perspective, the Portuguese Empire should incentive the immigration through colonies similar to those established in the United States. He harshly criticized the Empire of Brazil for not abolishing slavery after its independence.

=== Freedom of press ===
The periodical was also an advocate for the freedom of press. Hipólito was in favor of the free circulation of ideas by any written means, but was against anonymity. He advocated that every text should be signed as a way to hold the author accountable for false allegations. He was also against the abuse of the press, in cases that would hurt the Law. He welcomed the creation of Impressão Régia, the first Brazilian press, praising both Dom João IV and Rodrigo de Sousa Coutinho.

=== Religion ===
Correio Braziliense defended the freedom of religion and the state shouldn't interfere with one's choice of religiosity. The periodical also defended Freemasonry and other private religious institutions.

=== Literature and sciences ===
The Literature and Sciences section of Correio Braziliense had on average from 20 to 40 pages and was not published only in nine volumes. There, it was published several works from a wide range of scientific and literary fields fully in Portuguese. Usually, Hipólito shortly wrote a synthesis of the topic, sometimes published the entire work, and if he disagreed with something, he would write his commentaries in the end.

The first analysis made by Hipólito was Noticia Histórica do Estàdo actual da Inglaterra neste anno de 1808 (Historical News of the actual state of England in this year of 1808). The text was ordered by the Government of France to show the supposed decline of England. Hipólito criticized the text affirming the French Government used fake documents to prove its point.

Other critiques made by Hipólito were the creation of the University of France, which he had accused France of seeking the monopoly of the knowledge production, the Jesuitic education in Brazil, the Portuguese censorship and Inquisition, and the creation of the Royal Military Academy of Rio de Janeiro, which was heavily centralized under the leadership of Rodrigo de Sousa Coutinho.

Correio Braziliense had also published several literary critiques, including against Gama, from Father José Agostinho de Macedo, on the grounds of trying to copy Os Lusíadas, and the Portuguese translation of Atala, from François-René de Chateaubriand, and the works of José da Silva Lisboa, for being too submissive of the Crown.

Hipólito had also transcribed travel literature, especially of scientific interest. He had published scientific expeditions to Spain, Poland, Switzerland, Russia, Greece, Ilha da Madeira, and other lands. He would also publish works made by travellers that criticized Brazil and Portugal in general, such as Tratado sobre a defesa de Portugal, com um mapa militar do Paiz.. (Treaty about the defense of Portugal, with a military map of the country...) (1810) from Guilherme Granville Elliot, Travels in the Interior of Brazil (1812), from John Mawe, and Viagem em torno do Mundo, nos Annos de 1800, 1801, 1802, 1803, e 1804... (Travel around the world, in the years of 1800, 1801, 1802, 1803, and 1804...) (1816), from John Turnbull.

The periodical had also published several scientific discoveries, debates and events, including the discovery of new comets and the Newtonian physics that allowed their breakthrough, earthquakes, studies about the alcoholic level and fermentation of wines and liquors, the emission of explosive gases in coal mines, crystal refraction, vaccination, and the salt composition of the mineral water of Araxá.

=== Arts ===
Correio Braziliense considered inventions and mechanical innovations as "art", and it had published the creation of the surge arrester, advancements in architecture, engineering and nautical sciences, the bettering of the typography and musical instruments, and other topics.

=== Other critiques ===
In 1808, Hipólito criticized the aposentadoria (retirement) tax paid by the Portuguese court to compensate for the houses occupied by them after their transfer to Brazil.

== Coverage ==
=== Pernambucan Revolution ===
Coverage of the Pernambucan revolution began in April 1817, when Correio Braziliense published a letter about the dissatisfaction in Pernambuco regarding the corruption and abuses perpetrated by Caetano Pinto. In May, the periodical broadened the coverage and published the spread of the revolution to the other captaincies. Documents, manifests and speeches from the Provisional Government were also published. In the next months, Hipólito changed his initial position regarding it and criticized their leadership, calling them "unprepared", their choice for a republican government, and the imposition of their reforms through "unfair means", besides avoiding the use of the term "revolution". In August, after the suffocation of the revolution, Hipólito called it "criminal and imprudent". The sudden change of the coverage was partly due a dispute with the Venezuelan periodical Correo del Orinoco.

The magazine wrongly stated the captaincies of Maranhão, Itamaracá and Pará also joined the republicans and Felix José Tavares Lira was named a Diplomat for the Viceroyalty of the Río de la Plata. The magazine later redacted the information, but it was accepted as a historical fact by many historians.

=== Independence of Brazil ===
Correio Braziliense was initially against the independence of Brazil, as it supported the creation of a unified Lusitan kingdom. Despite that, Correio Braziliense had always criticized the decisions taken by the Crown against Brazil. In March 1822, Hipólito published an article defending the unity of the Kingdom by creating a central government under the leadership of Dom Pedro I. In the next month he declared Brazil was right in disobeying the Crown's orders and officially began supporting the independence of Brazil.

== Legacy ==
Correio Braziliense is considered the first Brazilian magazine and Hipólito is considered the father of Brazilian press. From 1999 on, the Day of the Press was changed by Fernando Henrique Cardoso and José Carlos Dias to 1 June, the beginning of circulation of the periodical. Hipólito's name was also included in 2010 on the Book of Heroes of the Homeland by José Alencar Gomes da Silva and João Luiz Silva Ferreira during Lula's term.

Assis Chateaubriand was influenced by the periodical and on 21 April 1960, during the inauguration of Brasília, he launched his magazine Correio Braziliense as a homage, as the idea of constructing a new capital in the countryside and its name were Hipólito's.

Up until 2006, there were few works specifically written about Correio Braziliense, being Alfred Hower's Hipólito da Costa and Luso-Brazilian Journalism in Exile (1954), Mecenas Dourado's Hipólito da Costa e o Correio Braziliense (1957), Carlos Rizinni's Hipólito da Costa e o Correio Braziliense (1957), Rolando Monteiro's Hipólito da Costa e a Independência (1979) Barbosa Lima Sobrinho's Antologia do Correio Braziliense (1977), Theresinha Castro's Hipólito da Costa: Idéias e Ideais (1987), Sérgio Góes de Paula's Hipólito da Costa (2001) and Imprensa Oficial do Estado de São Paulo's Hipólito da Costa, Pioneiro da Independência do Brasil (2002).

== See also ==
- List of magazines in Portugal
