= O Investigador Portuguez em Inglaterra =

O Investigador Portuguez em Inglaterra, ou Jornal Literário, Político, & C.
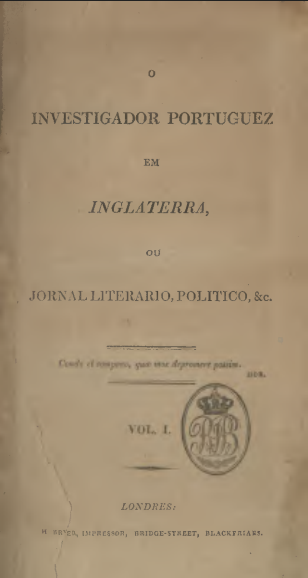
- Cover page for the first volume
- Frequency: Monthly
- Founder: Domingos António de Sousa Coutinho, Bernardo José Abrantes e Castro and Nolasco da Cunha
- First issue: July 1811
- Final issue Number: February 1819; 92
- Country: Portuguese Empire
- Based in: London, United Kingdom of Great Britain and Ireland
- Language: Portuguese

O Investigador Portuguez em Inglaterra, ou Jornal Literário, Político &, C. (The Portuguese Investigator in England, or Periodical of Politics, Literature & S.) was a monthly Portuguese periodical created in 1811, London, by the diplomat Domingos António de Sousa Coutinho together with Bernardo José Abrantes e Castro and Nolasco da Cunha, both in political exile in the United Kingdom of Great Britain and Ireland.

It is considered one of the most important and popular Lusitan periodicals of its time. It had ties with the Portuguese court, but it was critical of their politics and advocated for the instauration of a constitutional monarchy. It was also an avid scientific divulgator, and introduced the field of history of science in the Portuguese Empire.

The last issue was published in February 1819, shortly after the exit of José Liberato Freire de Carvalho from the editorial board.

== History ==
O Investigador Portuguez was created in 1811, London, by the diplomat Domingos António de Sousa Coutinho together with Bernardo José Abrantes e Castro and Nolasco da Cunha, both in political exile on the United Kingdom of Great Britain and Ireland. Domingos guaranteed the survival of the periodical through his brother, Rodrigo de Sousa Coutinho, that made the commitment of buying a certain quantity of the monthly issues. While Nolasco da Cunha was the editor-in-chief of the periodical, Abrantes de Castro was responsible for the scientific texts. Coutinho hated the critics made by Hipólito da Costa in his journal Correio Braziliense and created the periodical specifically to debunk their thesis. The journal would constantly criticize the diplomat, including the return of French Guiana to France with nothing in return, a failure attributed to him. Despite the rivalry between the two periodicals, Hipólito da Costa had praised O Investigador Portuguez in several occasions.

The first issue was published in July 1811. Together with Correio Braziliense, it is considered one of the most important and popular periodicals from its time, escaping the censorship imposed by the Portuguese Empire. The Kingdom didn't officially support it, but also didn't openly fight it, as it was with Correio Braziliense. It is not known how popular the periodical was in Brazil due lack of data, but it is known it was read by some important political figures and its subscription was incentivised.

In 1812, Nolasco da Cunha received the royal pardon and returned to Portugal. José Liberato Freire de Carvalho, also in political exile in London, took his place. The Brazilian doctor Miguel Caetano de Castro took Abrantes de Castro's position.

In 1814, Freire de Carvalho became the editor-in-chief. After the substitution of Domingos António for Pedro de Sousa Holstein as the Portuguese diplomat in London, Freire de Carvalho consulted him about a possible contract with the embassy and, discovering he wasn't tied by any contract whatsoever, he decided to create a new section entitled "Reflections" to boost sales. It was more critical than usual regarding politics.

In 1815, Freire de Carvalho criticized the role of Pedro de Sousa during the Congress of Vienna. The ambassador then proposed to the periodical that articles about politics should be arranged with him behind closed doors, which was refused by Carvalho.

The periodical was cancelled shortly after the departure of Freire de Carvalho from the editorial board in December 1818. The last edition, number 92, was published in February 1819.

== Content ==
O Investigador Portuguez was published monthly and in Portuguese. It was initially divided into four sections: Literature, Sciences, Correspondence and Politics.

=== Literature ===
This was the first section of the periodical. It was subdivided into the following sections: Political Literature, Literature, Portuguese Literature, Portuguese and Foreigner Literature, Classical Literature, German Literature and Poetry.

It divulgated news about literature and published parts of works and their critique.

In 1811, the periodical harshly criticized the narrative poem Gama, from Father José Agostinho de Macedo. The critique generated a debate with the author that lasted up until 1812. Correio Braziliense defended the critique and extensively notified the debate.

=== Sciences ===
This section was subdivided into the following sections: Agriculture, Political Economy, Sciences, Medicine, Agriculture and Commerce and Agriculture and Botanics.

The Investigador gave special importance for the scientific divulgation. Despite this section only composing 10% of the periodical, several texts about sciences were published on the other sections. The periodical considered itself utilitarian and tried to highlight Lusitan scientists. The section first brought forward news about sciences in general and their applications, specially on the fields of medicine, botany, agriculture and mineralogy. The periodical was known for publishing long articles, that commonly had to be split on several issues.

On the first issue, the periodical published the histories of chemistry and medicine, thus introducing the field of history of science in the Portuguese Empire. Amongst other topics covered by the periodical were mathematics, zoology, geography and physiology.

=== Correspondence ===
The correspondence section highlighted the best professors of medicine and surgery. Observations, speeches and memories from the readers were also published. The periodical also incentivised the debate of ideas and controversies, that often involved other periodicals, including Jornal de Coimbra and Correio Braziliense.

=== Politics ===
This section was further subdivided in the following sections: Politics, Politics and Varieties, Commerce and Varieties.

In this section, news was mixed with opinions of the editorial board. The periodical was aligned with the values of the French Revolution. It considered the Portuguese Empire as behind other European countries in social matters and criticized the absolutism of Dom João VI, but it defended a reform of the State into a constitutional monarchy, that was situated "between despotism and Jacobitism", to avoid a sudden rupture on the governance of the empire. It openly supported religious tolerance, political freedom, civil rights and freedom of speech.

With the advance of the Spanish American wars of independence, the periodical further distanced from revolutionary ideas and militated for the English model of governance.

=== Others ===
There were three other spaces in the periodical, Appendix, Reflexions and Lists. In the last section, it published books of several fields of knowledge and from several countries, but giving priority for English books. Reflections was created in 1814 and it had its own motto and was overall more critical than usual.

== Bibliography ==
- Andrade, Breno Gontijo (2012). "A Guerra das Palavras: cultura oral e escrita na Revolução de 1817". Post-graduation thesis in History (in Brazilian Portuguese). Federal University of Minas Gerais.
- Brasil, Bruno (11 May 2021). "200 anos da Independência | Hipólito José da Costa Pereira". BNDigital (in Brazilian Portuguese).
- Domingues, Ângela (2006). "Notícias do Brasil colonial: a imprensa científica e política a serviço das elites (Portugal, Brasil e Inglaterra)". Varia Historia (in Brazilian Portuguese). 22 (35). Federal University of Minas Gerais. doi:10.1590/S0104-87752006000100009.
- Machado, Adelaide Maria Muralha Vieira (2011). "A importância de se chamar português: José Liberato Freire de Carvalho na Direcção do Investigador Português em Inglaterra, 1814-1819" (PDF). PhD in History and Theory of Ideas (in Portuguese). NOVA University Lisbon.
- Oliveira, José Carlos de (1998). "Os periódicos portugueses de Inglaterra e a cultura científica brasileira (1808-1821)". Revista da Sociedade Brasileira de História da Ciência (in Brazilian Portuguese). 19. Sociedade Brasileira de História da Ciência: 31–62.
- Reis, Fernando José Egídio (2005). "Comunicando as Ciências ao Público. As ciências nos periódicos portugueses de finais do séc. XVIII e princípios do séc. XIX" (PDF). Actas dos III Sopcom, IV Lusocum e II Ibérico (in Portuguese). 3. NOVA University Lisbon: 305–315.
- Silva, César Agenor Fernandes da (2006). "O Correio Braziliense e seu projeto de civilização (1808-1822)". Masters Degree in History (in Brazilian Portuguese). São Paulo State University.
