= Manuel Maria Barbosa du Bocage =

Portuguese Neoclassic poet (1765–1805)

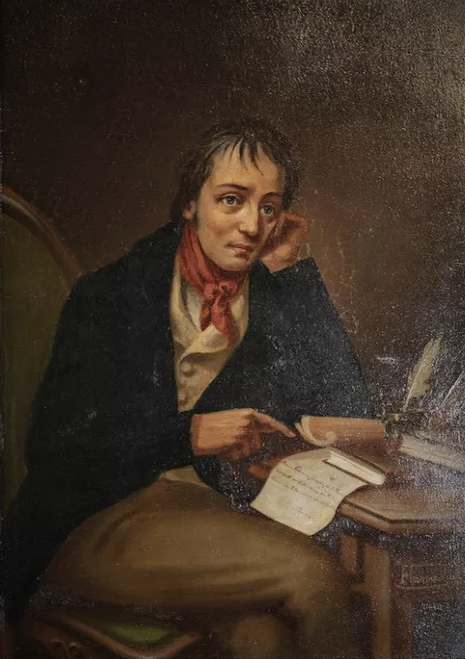
- Born: Manuel Maria Barbosa l'Hedois du Bocage; 15 September 1765; Setúbal, Portugal
- Died: 21 December 1805 (aged 40); Lisbon, Portugal
- Occupation: Poet
- Writing career
- Pen name: Elmano Sadino
- Notable works: A Morte de D. Ignez; A Pavorosa Illusão; A Virtude Laureada; Elegia; Improvisos de Bocage; Mágoas Amorosas de Elmano; Queixumes do Pastor Elmano Contra a Falsidade da Pastora Urselina
- Movements: Neoclassicism; Romanticism

Manuel Maria Barbosa l'Hedois du Bocage (15 September 1765 – 21 December 1805), most often referred to simply as Bocage, was a Portuguese Neoclassic poet, writing at the beginning of his career under the pen name Elmano Sadino.

== Biography ==
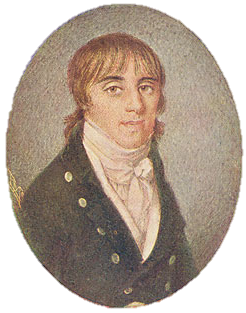
Bocage at around 20 years old

Bocage was born in the Portuguese city of Setúbal, in 1765, to José Luís Soares de Barbosa and Mariana Joaquina Xavier l'Hedois Lustoff du Bocage, of French family.

Bocage began to make verses in infancy, and being somewhat of a prodigy grew up to be flattered, self-conscious and unstable. At the age of fourteen, he suddenly left school and joined the 7th Infantry Regiment; but tiring of garrison life at Setúbal after two years, he decided to enter the Portuguese navy. He proceeded to the Royal Marine Academy in Lisbon but instead of studying he pursued romantic adventures. For the next five years he had numerous love affairs, and his retentive memory and extraordinary talent for improvisation gained him a host of admirers and turned his head.

Brazilian modinhas, short rhyming poems sung accompanied by a guitar at family parties, were very popular at the time, and Bocage added to his fame by writing a number of these, by his skill in extemporizing verses on a given theme, and by allegorical idyllic pieces, the subjects of which are similar to those of Watteau's and Boucher's pictures. In 1786 he was appointed guarda-marinha in the Portuguese India navy, and he reached Goa by way of the colony of Brazil in October. There he came into an ignorant society full of petty intrigue, where his particular talents found no scope to display themselves; the glamour of the East left him unmoved and the climate brought on a serious illness. In these circumstances he compared the heroic traditions of Portugal in Asia, which had induced him to leave home, with the reality, and wrote his satirical sonnets on The Decadence of the Portuguese Empire in Asia, and those addressed to Afonso de Albuquerque and D. João de Castro. The irritation caused by these satires, together with rivalries in love affairs, made it advisable for him to leave Goa, and early in 1789 he obtained the post of lieutenant of the infantry company at Damão, India; but he promptly deserted and made his way to Macau, where he arrived in July–August. According to a contemporary tradition, much of "Os Lusíadas" had been written there, and Bocage probably travelled to China following in the footsteps of another classic Portuguese poet, Luís de Camões, to whose life and misfortunes he loved to compare his own. Though he escaped the penalty of his desertion, he had no resources and lived on the charity of friends, whose help enabled him to return to Lisbon in the middle of the following year.

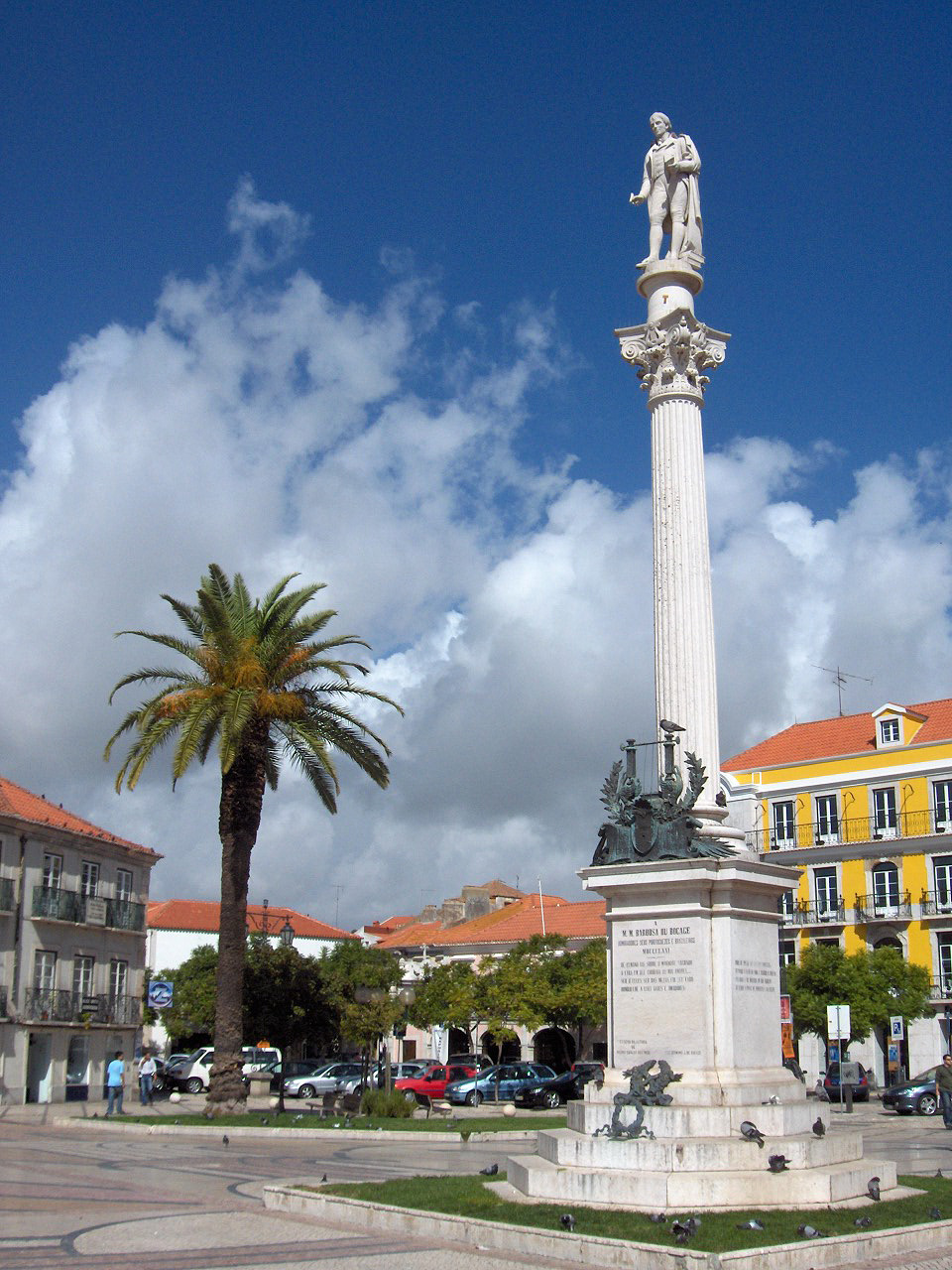
Statue at Setúbal, Portugal

Once back in Portugal he regained his old popularity, and resumed his vagabond existence. The age was one of reaction against the Marquis of Pombal's reforms, and his superintendent of police, Pina Manique, in his determination to keep out French revolutionary and atheistic propaganda, forbade the importation of foreign classics and the discussion of all liberal ideas. Hence the only vehicle of expression left was satire, which Bocage employed with an unsparing hand. His poverty compelled him to live with friends like the turbulent friar José Agostinho de Macedo, and he soon fell under suspicion from Manique. He became a member of the New Arcadia, a literary society founded in 1790, under the name of Elmano Sadino, but left it three years later. Though including in its ranks most of the poets of the time, the New Arcadia produced little of real merit, and before long its adherents became mutual enemies and descended to an angry war of words. But Bocage's reputation among the general public and with foreign travellers grew year by year. William Beckford, the author of "Vathek", for instance, describes him as a "pale, limber, odd-looking young man, the queerest but perhaps the most original of God's poetical creatures. This strange and versatile character may be said to possess the true wand of enchantment which at the will of its master either animates or petrifies."

In 1797 enemies of Bocage belonging to New Arcadia denounced him to Manique, who on the pretext afforded by some anti-religious verses, the Epistola a Marilia, along with accusations of immorality, arrested him when he was about to flee the country and flung him in the Limoeiro jail, where he spent his thirty-second birthday. His sufferings induced him to a speedy recantation, and after much importuning of friends, he obtained his transfer in November from the state prison to that of the Portuguese Inquisition, by then a lenient institution, and shortly afterwards recovered his liberty. He returned to his bohemian life and subsisted by writing empty Elogios Dramáticos for the theatres, printing volumes of verses and translating the didactic poems of Delille, Castel and others, along with some second-rate French plays. These resources and the help of brothers Freemasons enabled him to survive, and a purifying influence came into his life in the shape of a real affection for the two beautiful daughters of D. António Bersane Leite, which drew from him verses of true feeling mixed with regrets for the past. He would have married the younger lady, D. Anna Perpétua (Analia), but his earlier excesses had ruined his health.

In 1801 his poetical rivalry with Macedo became more acute and personal, and ended by drawing from Bocage a stinging extempore poem, Pena de Talião, which remains a monument to his powers of invective. In 1804 the illness (syphilis) from which he suffered worsened, and the approach of death inspired some beautiful sonnets, including one directed to D. Maria, elder sister of Analia, who visited and consoled him. He became reconciled to his enemies, and died on 21 December 1805 of an aneurysm. He died in poverty on the eve of the French invasion, in a similar way to how Camões' death came just before the occupation of Portugal by the Duke of Alva's army. The gulf that divides the life and achievements of these two poets is accounted for less by difference of talent and temperament than by their environment, and illustrates the decline of Portugal in the two centuries that separate 1580 from 1805.

To Beckford, Bocage was a powerful genius, and Link was struck by his nervous expression, harmonious versification and the fire of his poetry. He employed every variety of lyric and made his mark in all of them. His roundels are good, his epigrams witty, his satires rigorous and searching, his odes often full of nobility, but his fame must rest on his sonnets, which almost rival those of Camões in power, elevation of thought and tender melancholy, though they lack the latter's scholarly refinement of phrasing. So dazzled were contemporary critics by his brilliant and inspired extemporizations that they ignored Bocage's licentiousness, and overlooked both the superficiality of his creative output and the artificial character of most of his poetry. In 1871 a monument was erected to the poet in the main square in Setúbal, and the centenary of his death was observed there with great ceremony in 1905.

Perhaps because of the sheer rudeness of some of his verse Bocage is still a genuinely popular figure today, and not only in Setúbal. The subversiveness of his poems has meant that for much of the last 200 years they have not been (officially) available in Portugal: his erotic poetry was first published anonymously towards the end of the 19th century.

== See also ==
- Portuguese poetry
