= Diário Oficial da União =

Official journal of the Brazilian government

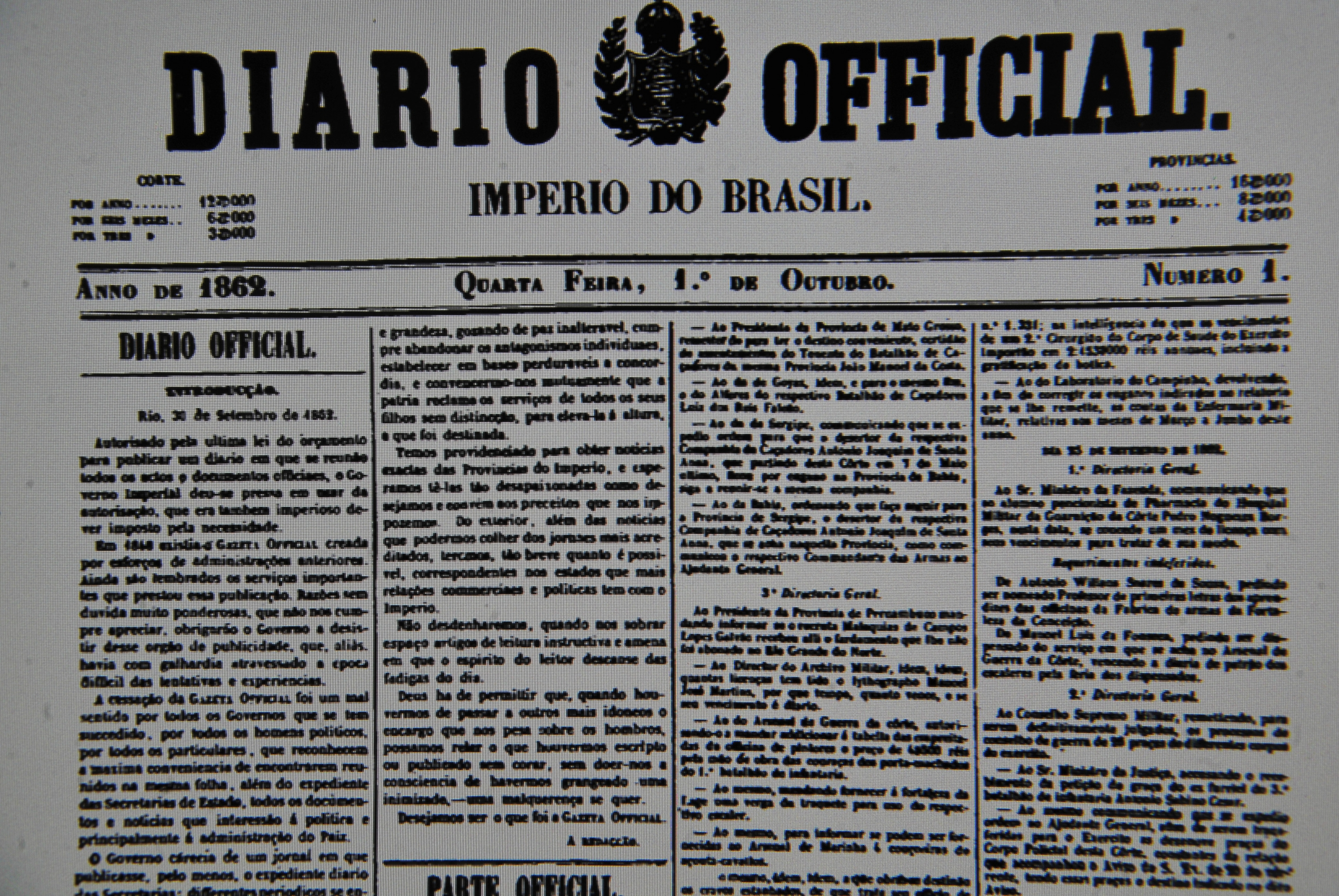
- First issue of the journal, published on 1 October 1862
- Type: Daily official journal
- Publisher: Federal government of Brazil
- Founded: 1 October 1862
- Language: Portuguese
- Headquarters: Brazil
- ISSN: 1676-2339
- Website: gov.br/imprensanacional
- Free online archives: biblioteca.in.gov.br

The Diário Oficial da União (literally Official Diary of the Union), abbreviated DOU, is the official gazette of the Federal Government of Brazil. It is published since 1 October 1862 and was created via the Imperial Decree 1,177 of its 9 September as the Official Journal of the Empire of Brazil. Its current name was adopted after Brazil became a federal republic, and the "Union" came into being as the legal personality of the new federal government. The official journal is published by the Brazilian National Press.

Though the journal has been published since 1862, it had many predecessors, as follows:

1. Gazeta do Rio de Janeiro (10/9/1808 – 29.12.1821)
2. Gazeta do Rio (1/1/1822 – 31/12/1822)
3. Diário do Governo (2/1/1823 – 28/6/1833)
4. Diário Fluminense (21/5/1824 – 24/4/1831)
5. Correio Oficial (1/7/1833 – 30/6/1836) e (2/1/1830 – 30/12/1840)
6. Without proper journal (31/12/1840 – 30/8/1846)
7. Gazeta Oficial do Império do Brasil (1/9/1846 – 31/7/1848)
8. Diário do Rio de Janeiro (1/6/1821 – 30/10/1878) – it published government material from 2/1/1841 – 30/8/1846 and from 1848 – 1862
9. Diário Oficial (16/11 – 28/11/1889)
10. Diário Oficial da República dos Estados Unidos do Brasil (24/11/1889 – 31/12/1891)
11. Diário Oficial – 1/1/1892 – current one
