= Paula Brito =

Brazilian writer and poet

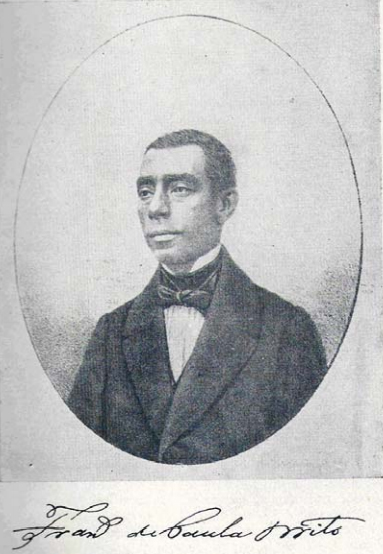
- Born: 2 December 1809; Rio de Janeiro
- Died: 5 December 1861 (aged 52)
- Occupation: Poet, publisher, journalist, typographer

Francisco de Paula Brito (2 December 1809 – 5 December 1861), who wrote under the name Paula Brito, was a Brazilian editor, journalist, writer, poet, playwright, translator and lyricist who was a precursor of the black press in Brazil. He worked in several printing shops and founded the Sociedade Petalógica, which had as a notable member the then-young writer Machado de Assis.

== Biography ==
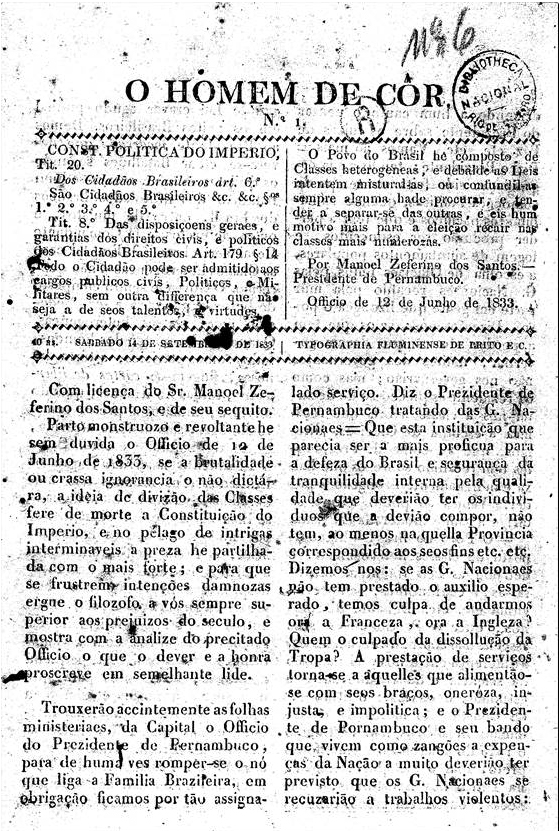
Front page of the first edition of O Homem de Côr (1833), the first newspaper of the Black Brazilian press

Francisco de Paula Brito was born into a humble family in what was then Rua do Piolho (now Rua da Carioca), in downtown Rio de Janeiro. He was the son of carpenter Jacinto Antunes Duarte and Maria Joaquina da Conceição Brito. He learned to read from his sister. Paula Brito lived in Magé from the age of six to fifteen, returning to his hometown in 1824, alongside his grandfather, Sergeant Major Martinho Pereira de Brito. He was a pharmacy assistant, apprentice typographer at Tipografia Nacional, and later worked at Jornal do Commercio as press director, editor, translator, and short story writer. In 1830, he married Rufina Rodrigues da Costa.

In 1831, Paula Brito bought a small establishment from a relative, Sílvio José de Almeida Brito, at Praça da Constituição, No. 31, where there was a stationery shop, a bookbinding workshop, and a tea shop. Paula Brito acquired a printing press from E. C. dos Santos and installed it there. In 1833, he had two establishments: Typographia Fluminense, at Rua da Constituição, No. 51, and Typographia Imparcial, at No. 44. In 1837, he moved to No. 66 and expanded the store to No. 64 in 1839. In 1848, Brito owned 6 manual printers and one mechanical printer, and expanded his facilities to numbers 68 and 78, the latter constituting his Loja do Canto, his bookstore and stationery shop, and created branches in partnership with Antônio Gonçalves Teixeira e Sousa and Cândido Lopes, forming with the latter the Tipografia e Loja de Lopes e Cia, in Niterói.

He was a political activist and the first to introduce racial issues into the country's political debate. His printing house printed works such as O Mulato and the newspaper O Homem de Cor, the first Brazilian newspaper dedicated to the fight against racial prejudice, placing him as a precursor of the black press in Brazil.

During the regency period, pasquinades gained prominence in Brazil, and the printing press was one of the points of expression for those dissatisfied with the country's political landscape. Paula Brito became an accomplice of those who sought him out to have their work printed in secret. He created, in his store, the Sociedade Petalógica, or Petalogical Society of Rossio Grande, a name due to the "freedom" that Brito claimed its members gave to imagination (a peta = a lie), and which brought together the romantic movement of 1840–1860: Gonçalves Dias, Laurindo Rabelo, Joaquim Manuel de Macedo, Manuel Antonio de Almeida. The entire elite of the time, including politicians, artists and leaders, gathered at the "Paula Brito Bookstore". In 1851, one of the sotre's magazines, A Marmota na Corte, included an insert with a costume, and Paula Brito brought the lithographer Louis Therier from Paris, who began to make the lithographs for the magazine.

On 2 December 1850, he created the "Imperial Typographia Dous de Dezembro", his own birthday and that of emperor Pedro II, who became his shareholder, a sponsorship given more for personal reasons than for political ones. Thus, Paula Brito was the first genuinely non-specialized publisher in the country, as he included a wide variety of works and subjects, unlike his predecessors, who were more dedicated to technical subjects. In 1832, Paula Brito published A Mulher do Simplício, or A Fluminense Exaltada, which was printed by Plancher. The magazine existed until 1846, when it was replaced by A Marmota, which lasted, with some title changes, from 1849 to 1864, 3 years after his death. Paula Brito was also one of the first Brazilian short story writers, in addition to writing plays and poetry.

There are records of 372 non-periodical publications by Paula Brito, on a variety of themes, including 83 in the medical field, but most of them were dramas. Brito encouraged national literature. The first Brazilian novel with some literary value is considered to have been O Filho do Pescador, by Antônio Gonçalves Teixeira e Sousa, published by Brito in 1843. She employed the poet Casimiro de Abreu and the young writer Machado de Assis, who began as a proofreader for Paula Brito and began his literary career as a contributor to A Marmota Fluminense. Paula Brito was Machado de Assis’ first editor. In 1857, dissatisfied shareholders succeeded in liquidating Typographia Dous de Dezembro, and his firm was transformed into Typographia de Paula Brito, with just one address, under the financial aid of the emperor. The number of books published fell to 12 in 1858 and 15 in 1861, the year of his death.

Paula Brito died at his home in Campo de Sant'Anna, No. 25, on 15 December 1861. His widow continued the business in partnership with her son-in-law until 1867, when production fell, and in 1868 Mrs. Rufina Rodrigues da Costa Brito was left alone, moving her business to Rua do Sacramento, No. 10, where it survived until 1875.
