= Black press in Brazil =

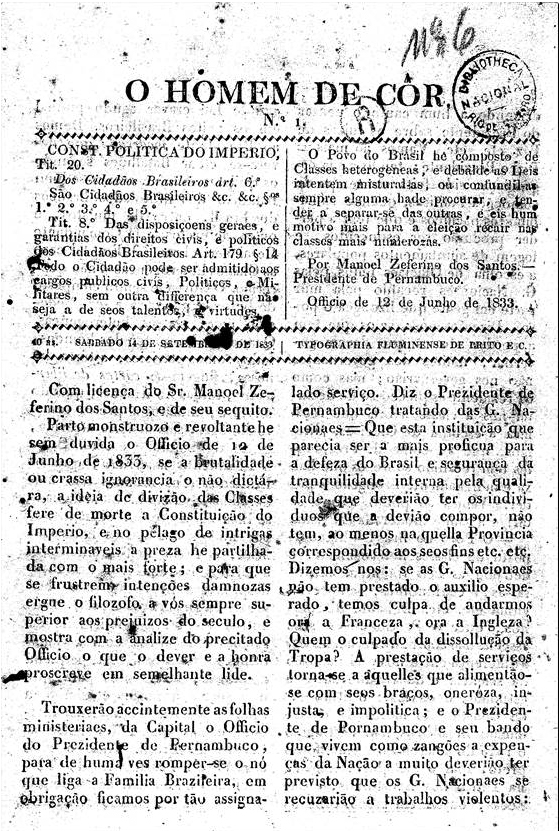
First page of the 01 edition of O Homem de Côr (1833), the first newspaper of the Brazilian black press.

Black press in Brazil is a journalistic movement aimed particularly, but not exclusively, at the documentation and public debate of issues involving Afro-Brazilians, such as racial discrimination, the recovery of dignity, identity, history, and culture of this population segment, as well as highlighting the protagonism of black personalities, proposing the deconstruction of the ideology of racial democracy and the formation of a new collective consciousness and a new social paradigm. The black press has been, since its origins, one of the most important and combative expressions of the Brazilian black movement.

== Origins ==
During the colonial period there were many challenges to slavery, but in general, black people were seen as inferior to white people and mere commodities, practically devoid of any rights. During this long period, the press was prohibited from operating by order of the Portuguese Crown, but pamphlets, leaflets, and books circulated widely clandestinely, often addressing demands. There are records that in 1789, when Bahian blacks promoted the Revolta dos Búzios, leaflets and manifestos were posted on houses and walls as a way to rally the insurgents and communicate to society their rejection of social inequalities and racial discrimination.

The press ban was lifted in 1808 with the arrival of the royal family, but the first legalized Brazilian periodical directed by and aimed at the black population, O Homem de Cor, was only launched in 1833 in Rio de Janeiro. It was printed at the typography of Francisco de Paula Brito, a free black man born in Rio de Janeiro who was already involved in newspaper printing and is considered one of the pioneers in the fight against slavery and racial prejudice in Brazil. It had only five editions, starting in September and ending in November of the same year. Shortly after the appearance of O Homem de Cor, four more periodicals were launched in 1833: Brasileiro Pardo, O Lafuente, O Cabrito, and O Crioulinho. None of them had a long life, but they had a significant impact beyond the specifically black community. According to Ana Magalhães Pinto, these early black newspapers did not focus on the problem of slavery but shared an idea, inspired by liberalism and Enlightenment, that individual talents and virtues, not skin color, should be the guarantee of equality and democracy. This did not negate their self-identification by color, but it should be understood in the context of the emergence of these newspapers when a legislative project was presented to establish the criterion of color for access to higher ranks in the National Guard and for identification in the voter registration list, even discriminating against legally free and emancipated blacks, which violated the constitutional text and the equality promises made by Emperor Pedro I. In Pinto's interpretation, while slavery was a legal institution, discrimination based on color, although serious and widespread, was only a custom, and legalizing it would exacerbate the problems faced by blacks in all areas, as well as remove all free blacks from strategic positions of military command, deprive them of political rights, and increase the state's control over this population.

First edition of A Redempção, January 2, 1887.

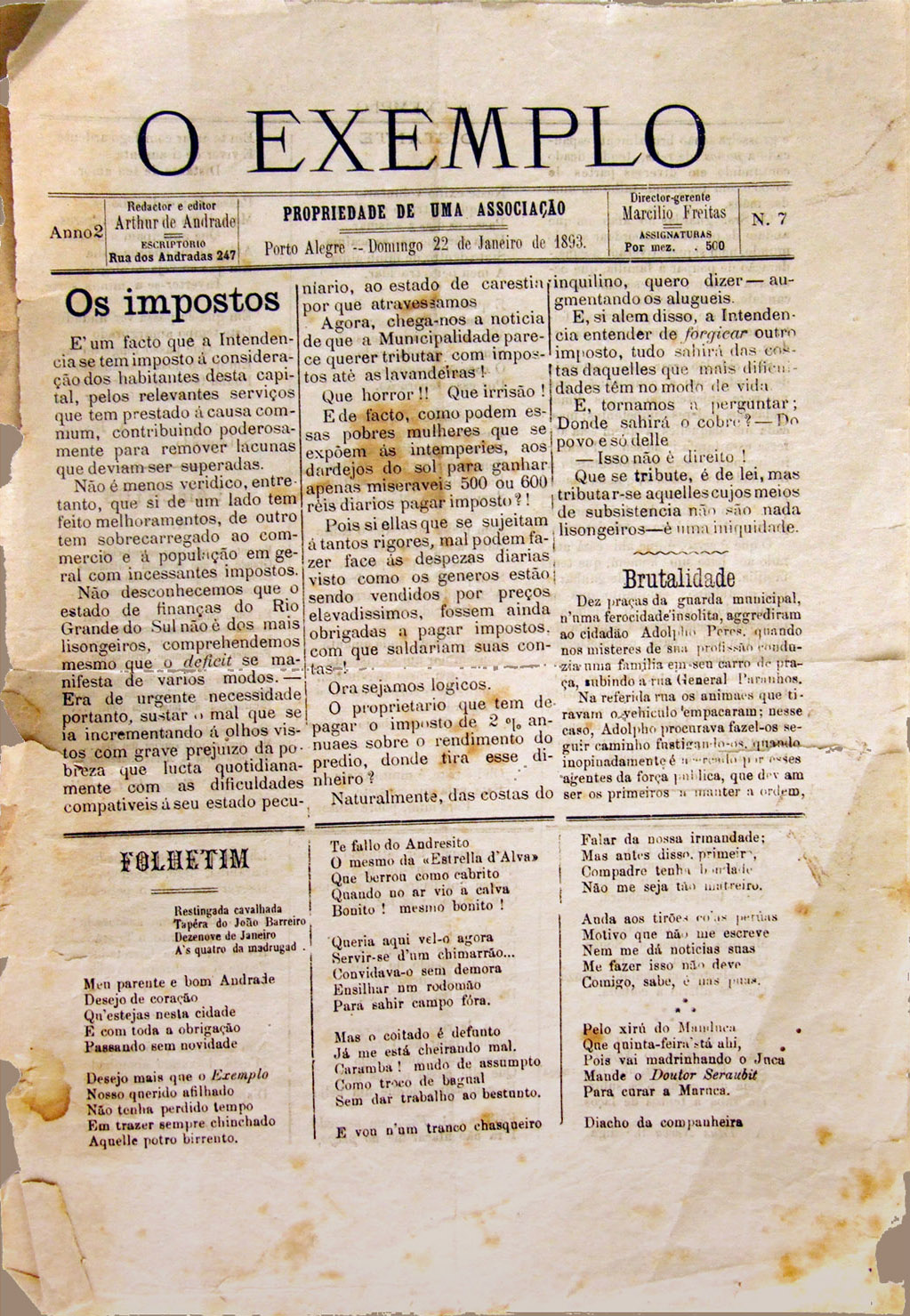
Issue no. 7 of O Exemplo, January 22, 1893.

In an unfavorable context for black people, other newspapers would take decades to emerge, reappearing only in 1876 in Recife with O Homem: Realidade Constitucional ou Dissolução Social, which reiterated the question of the illegality of discrimination against freedmen and pointed out that prejudice seemed to increase as more and more blacks became emancipated. It also made the first protests against pseudoscientific eugenic theories and population whitening projects. O Homem stood out from its predecessors due to a broader and deeper approach to issues relevant to black people, indicating that during this long period without press, there was a significant gain in experiences and knowledge to establish stronger arguments against slavery and discrimination, but like the others, it had a short life. From this time on, abolitionism became the dominant theme in the Brazilian black press, claiming the full integration of black people into society. There were also 31 leaflets and pamphlets exclusively dedicated to abolitionism between 1871 and 1888, the year of the abolition of slavery, such as Cidade do Rio by José do Patrocínio, and Gazeta da Tarde by Ferreira de Meneses, although not all of them were edited by black people but also by white sympathizers of the cause.

Several important periodicals emerged in the 19th century, such as A Pátria and O Progresso in São Paulo in 1899, and the long-lived O Exemplo in Porto Alegre in 1892. Although they had different and sometimes conflicting specific proposals, they shared the recognition of the need for education among the black population, aiming to overcome the stigma of black and mulatto individuals as lacking intellectual capacity and preparing them for the job market. They also aimed to create a collective identity consciousness that could unite the demands of different groups and strengthen the struggle for their rights. They also did not seem to have any nostalgia for the monarchy, which was abolished in 1889, despite the esteem dedicated to Princess Isabel, known as "the liberator". In several articles, it was noted that monarchical governments had alternated between liberals and conservatives, and little changed in the situation of black people. On the other hand, the republican project seemed much more promising, heralding a new era of equal rights, democracy, and full citizenship. However, although these rights were secured by law, in practice, they would be constantly violated, and the deceptive idea of racial democracy allegedly implemented gained strength, increasing the feeling among black people that the official promises once again had been empty and that their situation, instead of improving, was worsening.

Indeed, at that time, a mass of low-skilled European immigrants was entering the country, competing more or less for the same job market, many people in the countryside lost their place to live and were pushed into urban favelas without any structure or support, a law in 1890 banned the entry of any black person into the country, a historiographical discourse sought to erase the contribution of black people to the nation's growth—both in purely economic and cultural terms—and population whitening theories gained new momentum, extending their influence into the early decades of the 20th century.

== 20th century ==
In the early decades of the 20th century, despite the extremely high illiteracy rate still prevalent among the black population, the number of newspapers and magazines multiplied rapidly, diversifying their profile, adding literary journalism and news journalism to the political-advocacy journalism. Although the black press had limited circulation at this time, mainly reaching the small portion of the black population who could read, it was common for literate individuals to serve as information multipliers, gathering around them a group of interested people and reading the newspapers aloud to them. In this sense, the press played an important educational role during this period, and there were constant articles urging people not to wait for government projects but to take the initiative to seek education voluntarily. According to Gonçalves & Silva, "there is almost no reference to education as a duty of the State and a right of families. The entities invert the question. Education appears as a family obligation. The criticism of the government's neglect of black education appears in the same proportion as racial protest intensifies, in other words, radicalizes." The publications "highlight the importance of equipping oneself for work, promote schools linked to black entities, with emphasis on those maintained by black teachers. There are messages exhorting parents to send their children to school and adults to complete or initiate courses, especially literacy courses. Reading and writing are seen as conditions for social advancement, that is, for achieving economic stability, and also for reading and interpreting laws and thus being able to enforce their rights."

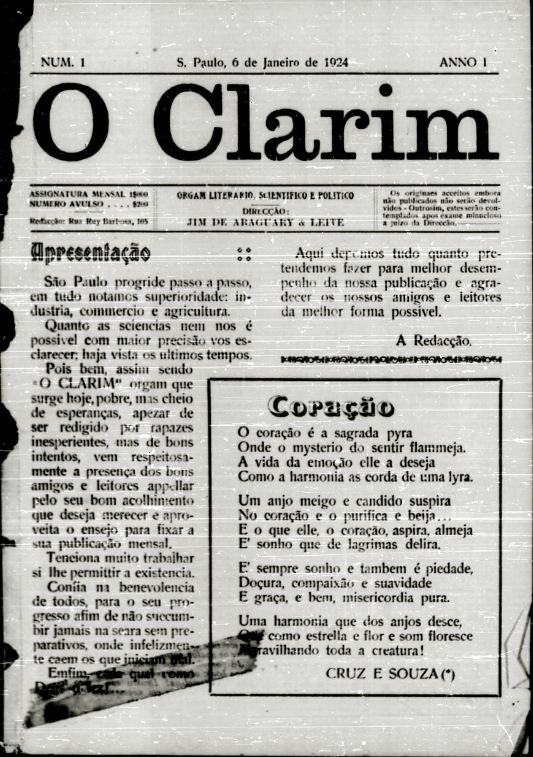
First edition of O Clarim da Alvorada, January 6, 1924.

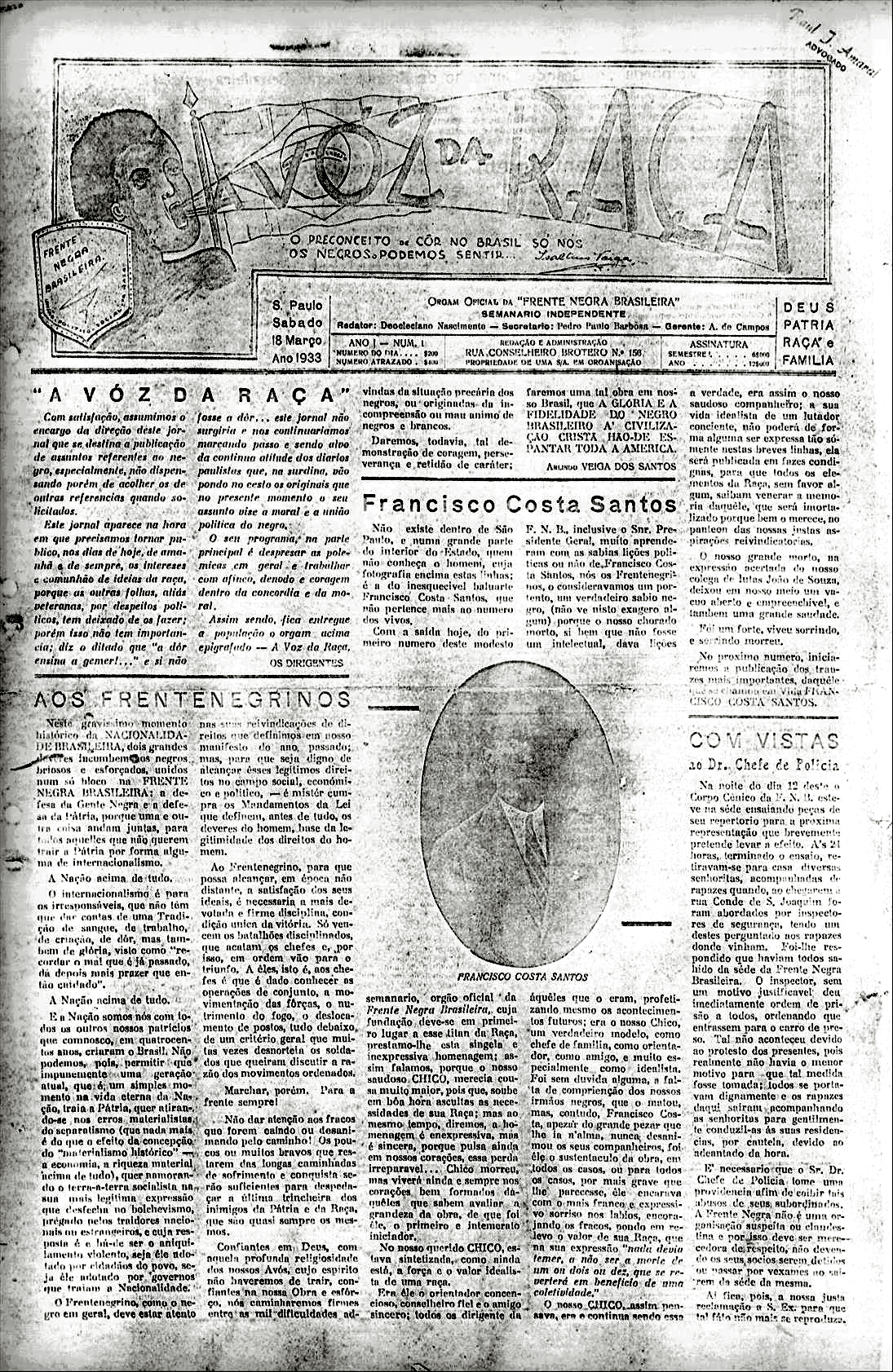
First edition of A Voz da Raça, March 18, 1933.

During this time, there was intense editorial activity in various areas. Many newspapers indicated the existence of libraries, cultural centers, technical and vocational courses, and reported conferences, theatrical performances, musical concerts, and other cultural activities, with the understanding that education went beyond mere literacy. Others provided space for the publication of poems, chronicles, apologues, epigrams, satires, news of general interest, protests against prejudice, articles on the reconstruction of lost cultural identity and the integration of blacks into Brazilian society, advocating the removal of a marginalized situation. Everyday events in the black community, such as parties, dances, poetry contests, and beauty contests, which were rarely covered by traditional media, were also promoted. At the same time, efforts were made to stimulate the formation of a proud consciousness of Negritude, encouraging the cultivation of self-esteem, memory, African ancestral culture, and traditions, warning against the danger of seduction by ideologies of population whitening, and promoting biographies of black leaders from Brazil and other countries as examples for others to follow. According to Leandro José dos Santos, "many publications indicated the rules and conduct that should be followed by members of their respective communities; even though the central concern was the integration and formation of collective black consciousness, many editorials valued sobriety, good manners, and a love for work, demonstrating adherence to the puritan ethical and moral values, which were also used as instruments of protest against color prejudice." Notable newspapers of this period include O Clarim da Alvorada (1924), founded by José Correia Leite and Jayme de Aguiar, and A Voz da Raça (1933), the official organ of the Black Front of Brazil, both in São Paulo, which was one of the main centers of black press activity in Brazil at that time. Up to the 1930s, approximately 30 black newspapers circulated in the state. In other states, the black press also mobilized, including examples such as União (1918) in Paraná, Raça (1935) in Minas Gerais, and Alvorada in Rio Grande do Sul, the latter being the longest-lasting black press publication in the country, published, with minor interruptions, from 1907 to 1965.

During the Vargas dictatorship, activism was proscribed, and black newspapers ceased to circulate. The movement resurfaced in 1945 with the launch of the periodical Alvorada, linked to the Association of Brazilian Blacks, soon followed by the newspapers O Novo Horizonte (1946), Senzala (1946), União (1947), Quilombo (1948), Cruzada Cultural (1950), Redenção (1950), A Voz da Negritude (1952), Notícias de Ébano (1957), O Mutirão (1958), Níger (1960), among others, published in various states, seeking to unite scattered activists and demand greater participation in the economy, more space in society, and more weight in political decisions. It was a moment of great advocacy fervor, with many blacks joining political parties and running for elected positions, but parties in general did not open up to their participation, and even the Brazilian Communist Party, which was among the most progressive, considered that specific black demands divided the struggle of workers. According to Gonçalves & Silva, "the entry of revolutionary ideas into the country incited debate and expanded the horizon of Brazilian black youth. The theme of Negritude became central to the black press in the 1950s. The ideas of Aimé Césaire, Senghor, Léon Damas, Langston Hughes helped combat prejudices based on color and race." On the other hand, social clubs, cultural associations, recreational and sports groups, religious brotherhoods, musical groups, and other forms of association and congregation proliferated, reinforcing ethnic solidarity and emphasizing the uniqueness and relevance of black culture for Brazilian society as a whole.

A new period of repression of activism and the press began in 1964 with the establishment of the military dictatorship, when censorship and ideological warfare were imposed, and dozens of black leaders were persecuted, arrested, exiled, tortured, or killed for their involvement in advocacy movements, considered a threat to national security and to the official propaganda of a supposedly racism-free country, where it was claimed that a racial democracy prevailed, which, nevertheless, was entirely rhetorical and fictitious. Flavia Rios said, "monitoring and censorship actions were not limited to traditional spaces of 'political action,' such as unions, newspapers, social movements, student organizations, and parties; there was also constant monitoring by security and repression agents of black sociability spaces and territories—such as samba schools and soul dances. Not to mention the censorship and alterations of lyrics in samba-enredo compositions."

The resumption of activities took place in the 1970s, when some pamphlets, newspapers, and literary collections with a black theme, some printed by hand, such as Árvore das Palavras (c. 1974), began to circulate clandestinely, gaining momentum after the founding of the Revista Tição in Porto Alegre in 1977, which was notable for its strong denunciation of racism and systemic violence against blacks and for making the first references to the specific condition of black women. It was edited by journalist and feminist Vera Daisy Barcellos. The Tição served as an encouragement for the launch of other publications, such as the newspaper Sinba (1977) and the collection Negrice (1977), and according to Oliveira Silveira, with "careful presentation, good layout, and content involving history, debates on racism, social, political, and cultural issues in general, [the Tição] reaffirmed the possibility of a vibrant, renewed, serious, and rich black press with diverse approaches, themes, and depth." However, the decisive moment came with the foundation of the Unified Black Movement in 1978, which had a cohesive, consistent, and broad proposal, advocating as its most basic demands the demystification of the ideology of racial democracy, the political articulation of the black population, the transformation of the black movement into a national mass movement, the formation of national and international alliances, organized confrontation of police violence, mobilization within unions and political parties, and the fight for the inclusion of African history and the history of blacks in Brazil in school curricula, as well as the emergence of specifically black literature as opposed to Eurocentric literature. This led to a rapid succession of new publications in various formats and with different objectives. Notable among them are Cadernos Negros, Jornegro, Jornal Abertura, Capoeira, all launched in 1978, followed later by many others such as Vissungo (1979), the magazine Ébano (1980), Nêgo (1981), Africus (1982), Nizinga (1984), Revista Raça (1996), which became a major and instant public success and a model for the launch of other media outlets, and the Journal of the Black Consciousness Nucleus of USP (1999).

From the 1980s onward, the focus of the black press changed: while it continued to denounce racism and inequality, the previous project of social inclusion through education, work, and puritan ethics was generally abandoned. Instead, there was a greater emphasis on deconstructing hegemonic discourses and deepening the understanding of all issues related to the black experience with a more solid scientific, sociological, and historical foundation. This was supported by the example of struggles against colonialism and racial discrimination in African countries, as well as the rapid growth of academic studies, NGOs, and university research centers focused on black culture and history in Brazil.

== Current situation ==
The black press of the past continues to play a current role as a historical document, and today it remains an extremely active arm of the black advocacy movement in the country. Its critical study began in the 1950s through Roger Bastide, but despite the advances made in recent decades, many publications, production locations, and various chronological periods are still poorly studied, little known, and poorly integrated into a comprehensive perspective of a movement that, contrary to what has been said in a multitude of works, is not fragmented and disconnected but has been developed with a firm and coherent guiding thread since the 19th century. The 19th-century newspapers in particular remained forgotten for a long time, overshadowed by the great attention given to the black press in São Paulo in the early 20th century, and only recently have they been receiving greater critical attention. However, the press in the Southeast region, mainly in São Paulo, is still the main focus of researchers. The study of the southern region has some works, but the study of other regions is still in an incipient state.

In 2018, a group of 38 19th-century black and abolitionist newspapers and leaflets were included in the Brazilian section of the Memory of the World Register, promoted by UNESCO, and are available for online consultation on the website of the National Library. According to Bruno Brasil, these periodicals housed in the National Library form a "unique and irreplaceable collection, not only because of what it represents in terms of the memory of the political and emancipatory engagement of the black population, [...] but also because of its place of prominence in a society engaged in the fight against racism, as well as in studying crucial historical processes for the development of a democratic world. [...] They had an impact in their time and beyond. They influenced the process of abolition of slavery decades before the signing of the Golden Law, signaling the triumph of civil society's pressures on the imperial State. Furthermore, the view of their collective emerges with unparalleled complexity, which is worth remembering in the present: while some of these newspapers were edited by black individuals concerned with the impacts of slavery on the black population from a humanitarian perspective, others were edited by white elites, liberals concerned with the consequences of maintaining the slave economy in relation to Brazil's positioning in politics and the international market."

According to Leandro José dos Santos, "the study of newspapers published by the black population shows that this press was a spring capable of making black social movements reflect on the specificities of their aspirations, their demands, and, above all, it allowed black men and women to reflect on the social, economic, political, and cultural conditions in which they were inserted." According to the Observatório da Imprensa (Press Observatory), the Brazilian black press is "a voice for the black people" and serves as "a vehicle and documentation of the struggle for racial equity. [...] Fortunately, with the increasing democratization of access to the internet and its tools, the black press has gained more space in the digital realm and has been reaching a larger audience and gaining visibility on portals such as Correio Nagô, O Menelick, Alma Preta, and Blogueiras Negras. Although the panorama seems positive, racial equity has not been fully achieved, and the black media still has a lot of work to do."

In the contemporary mainstream media in Brazil, deep structural racism is still evident, employing relatively few black professionals, giving little space to black issues, and primarily catering to the white middle class and elite. Blacks make up over 55% of the Brazilian population, but according to the Profile of the Brazilian Journalist 2012, only 23% were black. According to a study by the Multidisciplinary Studies Group on Affirmative Action — GEMAA, over 90% of opinion-forming columnists in Folha, Globo, and Estadão are white, reaching 99% at Estadão. GEMAA also stated that the profile of these columnists is not open to a popular point of view regarding the social and political problems of the country. Another survey conducted by the magazine Imprensa in 2001 found that out of the 230 newspaper newsrooms surveyed, only 85 claimed to have at least one black journalist, and the number of black editors accounted for only 1.6% of the total.

Furthermore, despite its importance to a large population and its global social impact in Brazil, according to Isabel Cristina da Rosa, the black press still remains largely on the sidelines of general studies on the history of the Brazilian press and among national communication theorists. She adds, "It is imperative to critically reflect on how this suppression, except for rare exceptions and brief mentions such as Bahia (1972), Melo (1972), and Werneck (1994), has served the perpetuation of racism and the prevalence of white supremacy in the thought and studies of communication, the press, and journalism in Brazil. Or about epistemicide as an instrument of racial domination, as discussed by the black philosopher Sueli Carneiro (2005)."

== See also ==
- Slavery in Brazil
- Media in Brazil
- African-American newspapers
- Black movement in Brazil
