= Counts and dukes of Linhares =

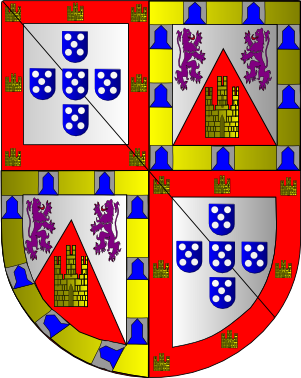
The coat of arms of the Noronha family, counts of Linhares (first creation).

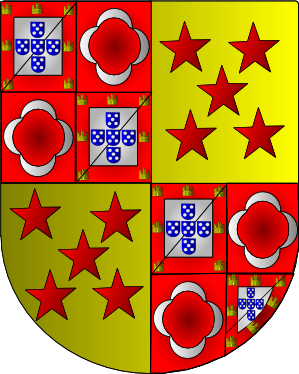
The coat of arms of the Sousa Coutinho family, counts of Linhares (second creation).

Count of Linhares (in Portuguese Conde de Linhares) was a Portuguese title of nobility created by a royal decree of king John III of Portugal dated from May 13, 1532, and granted to Dom António de Noronha, 2nd son of Pedro de Menezes, 1st Marquis of Vila Real.

This family went to live in Spain and remained faithful to the Spanish Habsburgs even after the Portuguese revolution of 1 December 1640, so the new dynasty of Braganza no longer recognized them as Counts of Linhares.

Later, in the 19th century, Queen Maria I of Portugal, granted again the title of count of Linhares (second creation), by a royal decree dated from December 17, 1808, to Rodrigo de Sousa Coutinho, 1st Count of Linhares Governor of Portuguese Angola, Portuguese ambassador in Turin and a remarkable statesman.

== List of counts of Linhares ==
=== First creation (1532) ===
1. António de Noronha (1464–1551), 1st Count of Linhares;
2. Francisco de Noronha (1507–1574), 2nd Count of Linhares;
3. Fernando de Noronha (c. 1540 – 1608), 3rd Count of Linhares;
4. Miguel de Noronha (c. 1585 – 1647), 4th Count of Linhares;
5. Fernando de Noronha (c.1600- ? ), 5th Count and 1st Duke of Linhares (not recognized in Portugal);
6. Miguel de Noronha (1645- ? ), 6th Count and 2nd Duke of Linhares (not recognized in Portugal).

=== Second creation (1808) ===
1. Rodrigo de Sousa Coutinho, 1st Count of Linhares (1755–1812);
2. Vitório Maria de Sousa Coutinho, 2nd Count of Linhares (1790–1857);
3. Rodrigo de Sousa Coutinho (1823–1894), 3rd Count of Linhares;
4. Fernando de Sousa Coutinho (1850–1897), 4th Count of Linhares;
5. Nuno de Sousa Coutinho (1854–1929), 5th Count of Linhares;
6. Carlos de Sousa Coutinho (1880- ? ), 6th Count of Linhares;
7. Nuno de Sousa Coutinho (1914–2006), 7th Count of Linhares.

== Dukes of Linhares/Liñares (Spanish title) ==
After 1640, to reward Fernando de Noronha, 5th Count of Linhares, fidelity to the Spanish Habsburgs, King Philip IV of Spain upgraded the title of Count to Duke of Linhares. However, as he was no longer King of Portugal, this title was never recognized in Portugal, but it still exists in Spain as Duke of Liñares once, in 1667, King Charles II of Spain changed it to the Spanish spelling.

The title of Duke of Liñares was later inherited by the Spanish Fernando de Lancastre y Noroña, Marquis of Porto Seguro, Duke of Abrantes and Duke of Liñares (all these three titles were granted by King Philip IV after 1640, to reward the fidelity of some Portuguese aristocrats to the Habsburgs and are not valid in Portugal).

== See also ==
- Dukedoms in Portugal
- List of countships in Portugal

== Bibliography ==
"Nobreza de Portugal e do Brasil" – Vol. II, pages 688/692. Published by Zairol Lda., Lisbon 1989.
