= Imprensa Nacional =

Brazil government press

Imprensa Nacional (Portuguese for National Press) is an institution of the Brazilian Government responsible for publishing both Diário Oficial da União and Diário da Justiça and for maintaining both the National Press Museum and the National Press Library. It was created as Impressão Régia (Royal Printing) by John VI of Portugal while Brazil was still a Portuguese colony. It served as official press of the United Kingdom of Portugal, Brazil and the Algarves when the Portuguese court moved to Brazil. After Peter I declared the independence of Brazil, it became the official press of the newly formed Brazilian Government and kept its status after Brazil became a republic.
