= Nelson Werneck Sodré =

Brazilian historian, military officer, and writer

- Born: Nelson Werneck Sodré; 27 April 1911; Rio de Janeiro, Rio de Janeiro, Brazil
- Died: 13 January 1999 (aged 87); Itu, São Paulo, Brazil
- Occupations: historian, writer, officer
- Political party: Brazilian Communist Party

Nelson Werneck Sodré (27 April 1911 – 13 January 1999) was a Brazilian Marxist military officer, professor, writer, columnist and historian.

== Biography ==
Nelson Werneck Sodré was born in Rio de Janeiro, then the city was capital of Brazil, on 27 April 1911. After studying in public schools and some boarding schools, he entered the Military College of Rio de Janeiro in 1924. He joined the Brazilian Army when he entered the Military School of Realengo in 1930. After completing the course in 1933, he was commissioned as an Aspirant to Officer in January 1934, and was soon assigned to serve in the 2nd Field Artillery Group in Itu, the historic Deodoro Regiment.

His debut in the mainstream press came in 1929, with the publication of the short story "Satânia", which won an award from the magazine O Cruzeiro. In October 1934, he began collaborating with the newspaper Correio Paulistano based in city of São Paulo. Two years later he became, in his own opinion, "a professional in the press", taking on the role of literary critic for the newspaper and being paid for the articles he published.

Between 1938 and 1945 he published several hundred articles in magazines and newspapers, as well as seven books: História da Literatura Brasileira, in 1938; Panorama do Segundo Império, in 1939; the second edition of História da Literatura Brasileira, in 1940; Oeste, in 1941; Orientações do Pensamento Brasileiro, in 1942; Síntese do Desenvolvimento Literário no Brasil, in 1943; Formação da Sociedade Brasileira, in 1944 and O que se Deve Ler para Conhecer o Brasil, in 1945.

A personal friend of intellectuals such as Graciliano Ramos and Jorge Amado, as well as other literary figures, he joined the Brazilian Communist Party (PCB) in the early 1940s.

Until the early 1950s, Nelson Werneck Sodré had a solid military career, where he became an instructor at the Escola de Comando e Estado-Maior do Exército, where he taught Military History. In 1954, he was dismissed from the General Staff School due to the political positions he took publicly: for taking part in the board of the Military Club, which was committed to fighting for a state monopoly on oil exploration and exploitation in Brazil, and for publishing, under a pseudonym, an article in the Military Club Magazine, clearly identified with the positions held by the PCB at the time, in which he opposed Brazil's participation in the Korean War.

Despite his links with the then Minister of War, General Newton Estillac Leal, who had presided over the Military Club during the Oil Campaign, Nelson Werneck Sodré had to settle for minor posts: as an artillery officer in a garrison in Cruz Alta, in the interior of Rio Grande do Sul, and in a Recruiting Circumscription in Rio de Janeiro (a position considered punitive at the time).

On 25 August 1961, Sodré was promoted, by seniority, to colonel in the Army. As a result, he was assigned to the headquarters of the 8th Military Region in Belém (Pará). In protest, he asked to be transferred to the reserve. He was also promoted to colonel in the Army.

During the crisis generated by the resignation of Jânio Quadros, Nelson Werneck Sodré was imprisoned for ten days for opposing the coup attempt to prevent the inauguration of the elected vice-president, João Goulart. With Goulart's inauguration, under a parliamentary regime, his request to join the reserve was rejected, annulled and, once again, Sodré was ordered to serve in the capital of Pará, Belém, now in a military district. For the second time, he requested to be removed from active service in the Army and was excluded from the military ranks. He was also sent to the army to serve in the army.

== At ISEB ==
At the beginning of 1954, Sodré was invited by Alberto Guerreiro Ramos to take part in the Brazilian Institute of Economics, Sociology and Politics (IBESP), which offered postgraduate courses in the auditorium of the Ministry of Education and Culture. IBESP was, according to Sodré, the "preliminary phase of ISEB", and his interaction with the Ibespians only began in 1955, after he returned to Rio de Janeiro, invited by General Newton Estillac Leal to serve on his General Staff.

At the end of Café Filho's presidency in 1955, IBESP underwent a reformulation that changed its name to Higher Institute of Brazilian Studies (ISEB). As some of its members had aligned themselves with Juscelino Kubitschek's candidacy, and the institution "[...] had no headquarters or structure, it continued, under another title, the new one, what IBESP had been doing".

At the start of Juscelino Kubitschek's presidency in 1956, the ISEB's structure was strengthened and became more stable, although the courses were still held in the auditorium of the Ministry of Education and Culture. The following year, the Institute moved into its original headquarters in the Botafogo neighborhood in the south zone of Rio de Janeiro.

From the beginning of the Kubitschek administration, the ISEB's problem of Brazilian development outlined the existence of two tendencies: the one that supported the participation of foreign capital in the Brazilian economy to accelerate the pace of its expansion, and the one that defended the autonomous nature of the country's industrialization process, admitting the presence of foreign capital only under the strict control of the state.

The conflicts between the adherents of these two orientations led to the exclusion of the so-called 'submissive to foreign interests' from the ISEB in 1960. Nelson Werneck Sodré identified himself with the thesis of the autonomous development of the Brazilian economy. Through studies focused on the relationship between colonialism and imperialism, the formation and constitution of social classes in Brazil and, in particular, the discussion of who the Brazilian people were and the role they could play in the anti-imperialist struggle, our author oriented his intellectual production towards identifying the class or class alliance that could lead the revolutionary process in the country.

Participation in the ISEB also marked Nelson Werneck Sodré's return to publishing books. In 1957, he published As Classes Sociais no Brasil, a course he had given at IBESP in 1954, and O Tratado de Methuen. In 1958, it was the turn of Introdução à Revolução Brasileira.

In 1959, at the request of Umberto Peregrino, who ran the Army Library, Sodré organized an anthology of Brazilian military episodes, Narrativas Militares. The following year saw the publication of the third edition of História da Literatura Brasileira, a new work that retained only the title of his debut book, and the second edition of O que se Deve Ler para Conhecer o Brasil, a reference work that also retained only the name when compared to the original edition.

In 1961, Sodré released a collection of essays, A Ideologia do Colonialismo. In November of that same year, in the rank of Brigadier General in the Brazilian Army, Sodré requested his transfer to the reserve (he never served as a general on active duty). With his transfer to the reserve, Nelson Werneck Sodré began to devote himself exclusively to intellectual work. He also became a member of the Brazilian Army.

From the creation of the ISEB in 1956 until its extinction with the 1964 coup, Sodré was responsible for the Course on the Historical Formation of Brazil. This course resulted, after several reformulations, in the book Formação Histórica do Brasil, published in 1962. The interpretation of Brazilian social formation presented in Formação Histórica do Brasil also inspired the production of paradidactic material for secondary school teachers, História Nova do Brasil, produced with the collaboration of trainees from the History Department of the ISEB.

Still, in collaboration with interns from the History Department of the ISEB, who were in charge of the research, Nelson Werneck Sodré wrote the book Who Killed Kennedy in a few days, which was released in December 1963, two weeks after the assassination of the US president.

== After the 1964 coup ==
Two weeks after the 1964 coup, Nelson Werneck Sodré had his political rights revoked for ten years by the military junta that took power from the leftist João Goulart. Being imprisoned had more than just political and electoral consequences. The subsequent regulation of his punishment extended its effects, preventing him from teaching and writing articles for the press.

He chose not to go into exile and dedicated the next few years to resisting in the only way he could: by writing. As other means of communication were forbidden to him, he turned to writing books. Writing full time, and not counting re-editions, Sodré published four titles in 1965: Ofício de Escritor: dialética na literatura, O Naturalismo no Brasil, As Razões da Independência and A História Militar do Brasil.

Also in 1965, some of his titles began to be seized from bookstores and publishers' warehouses. In addition to História Nova do Brasil, copies of Quem Matou Kennedy, História da Burguesia Brasileira and A História Militar do Brasil were confiscated per government.

== Death ==
Nelson Werneck Sodré was lucid until the last days of his life. He was still working when he was admitted to the hospital, Santa Casa de Itu, in the interior of São Paulo, on 11 January 1999 for an operation. He died on 13 January of the same year due to multiple organ failure, sepsis and bronchopneumonia. He left behind a wife, Yolanda Frugoli Sodré, and a daughter, Olga.

=== Legacy ===
Sodré is considered one of the main Brazilian historians of the 20th century. In contemporary times, many academic studies have put Sodré's work, his life and his historiographical production back into the Brazilian intellectual debate.

== Work ==
- In 1966, Sodré published a reference work he had been preparing for decades, História da Imprensa no Brasil. In 1967, he released Memórias de um Soldado and the third edition of another reference work, O que se Deve Ler para Conhecer o Brasil, which was revised with each publication.
- In 1968, he published four anthologies: Fundamentos da Economia Marxista, Fundamentos da Estética Marxista, Fundamentos do Materialismo Histórico, and Fundamentos do Materialismo Dialético.
- In 1970, he published Síntese de História da Cultura Brasileira (written at the request of PCB leadership) and Memórias de um Escritor.
- In 1974, he published Brasil: Radiografia de um modelo.
- In 1976, he published Introdução à Geografia.
- In 1978, Sodré released three books: A Verdade sobre o ISEB, Oscar Niemeyer, and A Coluna Prestes.
- In 1984, he published Vida e Morte da Ditadura: vinte anos de autoritarismo no Brasil.
- In 1985, Nelson Werneck Sodré published three titles: Contribuição à História do PCB, O Tenentismo, and História e Materialismo Histórico no Brasil.
- In 1986, he released História da História Nova and A Intentona Comunista de 1935.
- In 1987, he published O Governo Militar Secreto and Literatura e História no Brasil Contemporâneo.
- In 1988, Memórias de um Escritor was republished under the title Em Defesa da Cultura.
- In 1989, he released A República: uma revisão histórica, A Marcha para o Nazismo, and O Populismo, a confusão conceitual, a brief essay marking his participation in the first direct presidential election in Brazil following the 1964 coup.
- In 1990, he published Capitalismo e Revolução Burguesa no Brasil, O Fascismo Cotidiano, and his memoir Desenvolvimento Brasileiro e Luta pela Cultura Nacional e A Luta pela Cultura.
- In 1992, he published A Ofensiva Reacionária, followed in 1994 by A Fúria de Calibã: memórias do golpe de 64.
- In 1995, Graphia Editorial published A Farsa do Neoliberalismo, followed by reprints of six of Sodré's works: Capitalismo e Revolução Burguesa no Brasil, Panorama do Segundo Império, Literatura e História no Brasil Contemporâneo, Formação Histórica do Brasil (with an afterword by Emir Sader), História da Literatura Brasileira (with an afterword by André Moisés Gaio), and As Razões da Independência (with an afterword by Ricardo Maranhão).
- In 1998, he published Tudo é Política, 50 anos do pensamento de Nelson Werneck Sodré, a collection of previously unpublished and censored texts organized by Ivan Alves Filho.

== Works about Sodré ==
- Lincoln de Abreu Penna, A República dos manifestos militares. Nelson Werneck Sodré, um intérprete republicano, Rio de Janeiro: E-Papers, 2011. ISBN 978-85-7650-310-1.
- José Paulo Netto, Nelson Werneck Sodré. O general da história e da cultura, São Paulo: Expressão Popular, 2011. ISBN 978-85-7743-192-2.
- Paulo Ribeiro da Cunha, 'Nelson Werneck Sodré. Entre o sabre e a pena', São Paulo: Ed. da Unesp, 2006. ISBN 85-7139-662-0.
- Marcos Silva, 'Nelson Werneck Sodré na historiografia brasileira' (Symposium on Nelson Werneck Sodré in Brazilian Historiography. University of São Paulo, Faculty of Philosophy, Letters, and Human Sciences, 1999), Bauru, SP: EDUSC (Ed. da Univ. do Sagrado Coração), 2001. ISBN 85-7460-116-0.
