= José Agostinho de Macedo =

Portuguese writer (1761–1831)

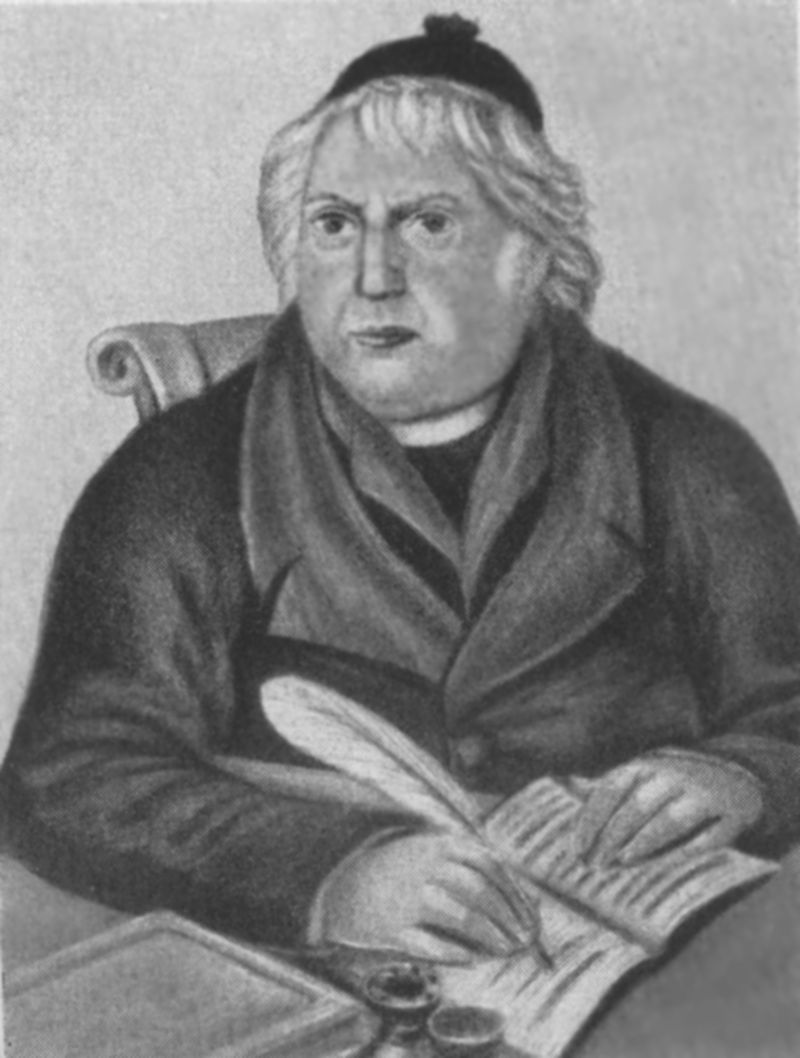
- Born: 11 September 1761; Beja, Kingdom of Portugal
- Died: 2 October 1831 (aged 70); Lisbon, Kingdom of Portugal
- Occupation: Writer

José Agostinho de Macedo (11 September 1761 – 2 October 1831) was a Portuguese poet and prose writer.

== Early life ==
José was born in Beja to a peasant family. He studied Latin and rhetoric with the Oratorians in Lisbon, Portugal. In 1778 he became professed as an Augustinian, but due to his turbulent character he spent a great part of his time in prison and was constantly being transferred from one convent to another, which resulted in him leaving the monastic lifestyle in order to live in urban Lisbon.

In 1792 he was unfrocked, but through powerful connections he obtained a papal brief which secularised him and permitted him to retain his ecclesiastical status. Taking to journalism and preaching, José made a substantial living and a unique position for himself. In a short time he was recognised as the leading pulpit orator of the day, and in 1802 he became one of the royal preachers.

== Career ==
Macedo was the first to introduce from abroad and to cultivate didactic and descriptive poetry, the best example of which is his notable transcendental poem Meditation (1813). His made an attempt to supersede Luís de Camões as Portugal's greatest poet, and in 1814 he produced Oriente, an epic dealing with the same subject as the Os Lusíadas, namely Vasco da Gama's discovery of the sea route to India. This amended paraphrase met with a cold reception, whereupon Macedo published his Censura dos Lusiadas, containing a minute examination and virulent indictment of Camões.

Macedo founded and wrote for a large number of journals, and the tone and temper of these and his political pamphlets induced his leading biographer to name him the chief libeller of Portugal, though at the time his jocular and satirical style gained him popular favor. An extreme adherent of absolutism, he expended all his powers of invective against the Constitutionalists, and advocated a general massacre of the opponents of the Miguelist régime. Notwithstanding his priestly office and old age, he continued his aggressive journalistic campaign, until his own party, feeling that he was damaging the cause by his excesses, threatened him with proceedings, which caused him in 1829 to resign the post of censor of books for the Ordinary, to which he had been appointed in 1824.

When he died in 1831 he left behind him many friends, a host of admirers, and a great but ephemeral literary reputation. His ambition to rank as the king of letters led to his famous conflict with Bocage, whose poem Pena de Taliao was perhaps the hardest blow Macedo ever received. His malignity reached its height in a satirical poem in six cantos, Os Burros (1812–1814), in which he pilloried by name men and women of all grades of society, living and dead, with the utmost licence of expression. His translation of the Odes of Horace, and his dramatic attempts, are only of value as evidence of the extraordinary versatility of the man, but his treatise, if his it be, A Demonstration of the Existence of God, at least proves his possession of very high mental powers. As a poet, his odes on Wellington and the emperor Alexander show true inspiration, and the poems of the same nature in his Lyra anacreontica, addressed to his mistress, have considerable merit.
