= Pina Manique =

Portuguese magistrate

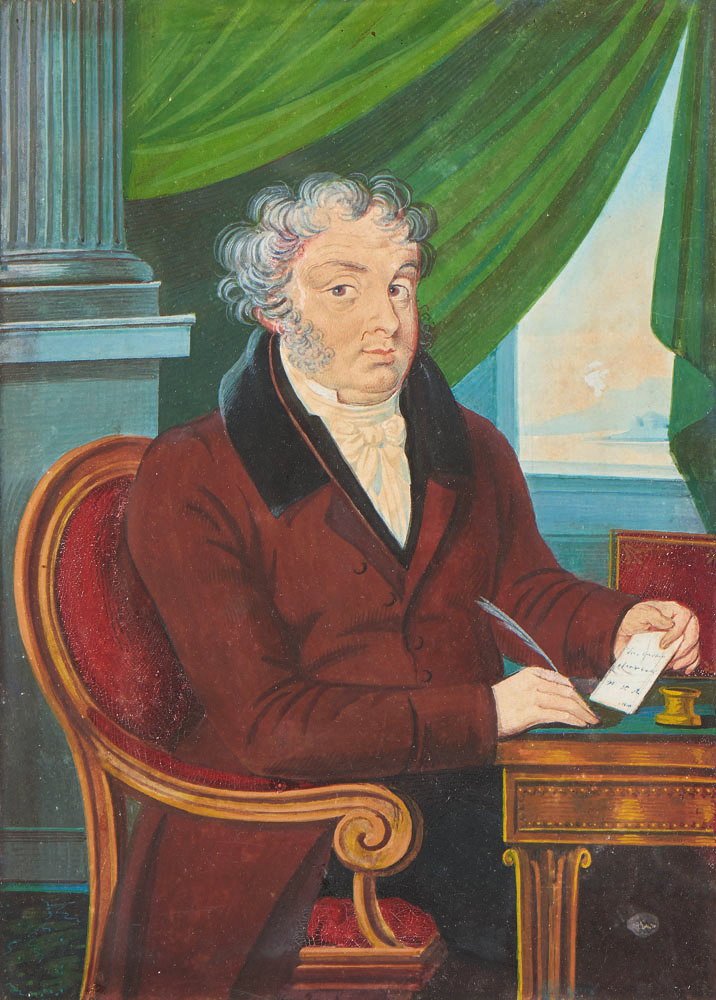
- Born: 3 October 1733; Lisbon, Kingdom of Portugal
- Died: 1 July 1805 (aged 71); Lisbon, Kingdom of Portugal
- Occupation: Magistrate

Dr. Diogo Inácio de Pina Manique (3 October 1733 – 1 July 1805) was a Portuguese magistrate.

== Early life ==
He was the son and heir of Pedro Damião de Pina Manique (Baptised Lisbon, Sé, 12 October 1704 - Lisbon, Santa Engrácia, 13 December 1756), who succeeded his father in the ground-rent of Knight-Fidalgo of the Royal Household (Alvará of 20 February 1715), 2nd Lord of the Office of Clerk of the County of the Masterdom of the Order of Christ, and 3rd Lord of the Majorat of São Joaquim, in the Village of Coina, who was also a Professed Knight of the Order of Christ, etc., great-great-grandson of a German, and wife (m. Oeiras, Porto Salvo, 25 July 1731) Helena Inácia de Faria (Baptized Lisbon, Santa Catarina, 17 February 1715 - Lisbon, Santa Engrácia, 27 March 1785).

== Career ==
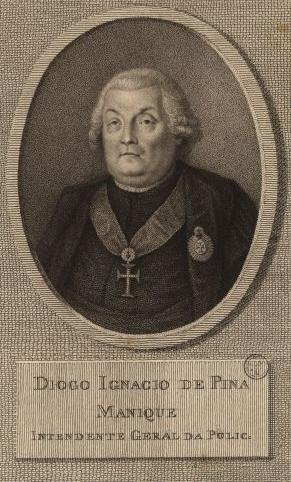
Engraving of Pina Manique while Superintendent-General of the Police.

He finished his Law course as a Bachelor from the University of Coimbra, becoming a Magistrate, and was assigned several important public tasks, including Criminal Law Judge for some of Lisbon's suburbs, Desembargador dos Agravos of the Palace and of the Appeal of Porto, Deputy of the Table of the Conscience and Orders, Counter of the Treasury, Administrator-General of the Great Customs of Lisbon and Overman-Major of the other Customs of the Realm, Superintendent-General of the Contrabands and Misleadings and Intendent of the Munitions, before being appointed as Police Superintendent or Intendent-General of the Police of the Court and Realm, Chancellor-Major of the Real and a Member of the Privy Council of His Most Faithful Majesty.

He was also the Founder and Administrator of the Royal Casa Pia of the Castle of São Jorge, where it started its mission, in 1781, Founder of the National Ropery and of the Royal Theatre of St. Charles.

He was the 3rd Lord of the Office of Clerk of the County of the Masterdom of the Order of Christ and 1st Lord of the Office of Clerk of the Biddery and Tomb of the Commands of the three Military Orders (Order of Christ, Order of Saint James of the Sword and Order of Aviz), Patron of the Mother-Church of St. Peter of the Village of Manique, of the collegiates of that church and the one of the Holy Spirit of Castelo de Vide, Commander of Santa Maria da Orada in the Order of Christ, 4th Lord of the Majorat of São Joaquim, in the Village of Coina, 1st Donatary Lord of the Manor and the Village of Manique, with nature of Majorat, which for his sake became called Manique do Intendente, 1st Alcaide-Major of Portalegre in his Family, Knight-Fidalgo added to Fidalgo-Knight of the Royal Household (Alvará of 5 November 1782), etc.

Although he was a man of confidence for the Marquis de Pombal, he was only appointed as Superintendent after the Marquis's death.

== Personal life ==
He married in Lisbon, São Cristóvão, on 8 December 1773 Inácia Margarida Umbelina de Brito Nogueira de Matos (Baptized Lisbon, Santa Justa, 31 July 1749 - Lisbon, Pena, 10 October 1808), Lady of a great House as the heir natural and legitimized (Royal Letter of 11 December 1769) daughter of Nicolau de Matos Nogueira de Andrade, Fidalgo-Chaplain of the Royal Household, Monsignor of the Patriarchate of Lisbon, Governor of the Archbishopric of Évora, Member of the Privy Council of His Majesty King Joseph I of Portugal, in which reign he died, condemned by the Court of the Inconfidency and deported to Angola, by order of the Marquis of Pombal, by Ana Joaquina de Santa Teresa de São Paio, and had four children.
