= Gazeta do Rio de Janeiro =

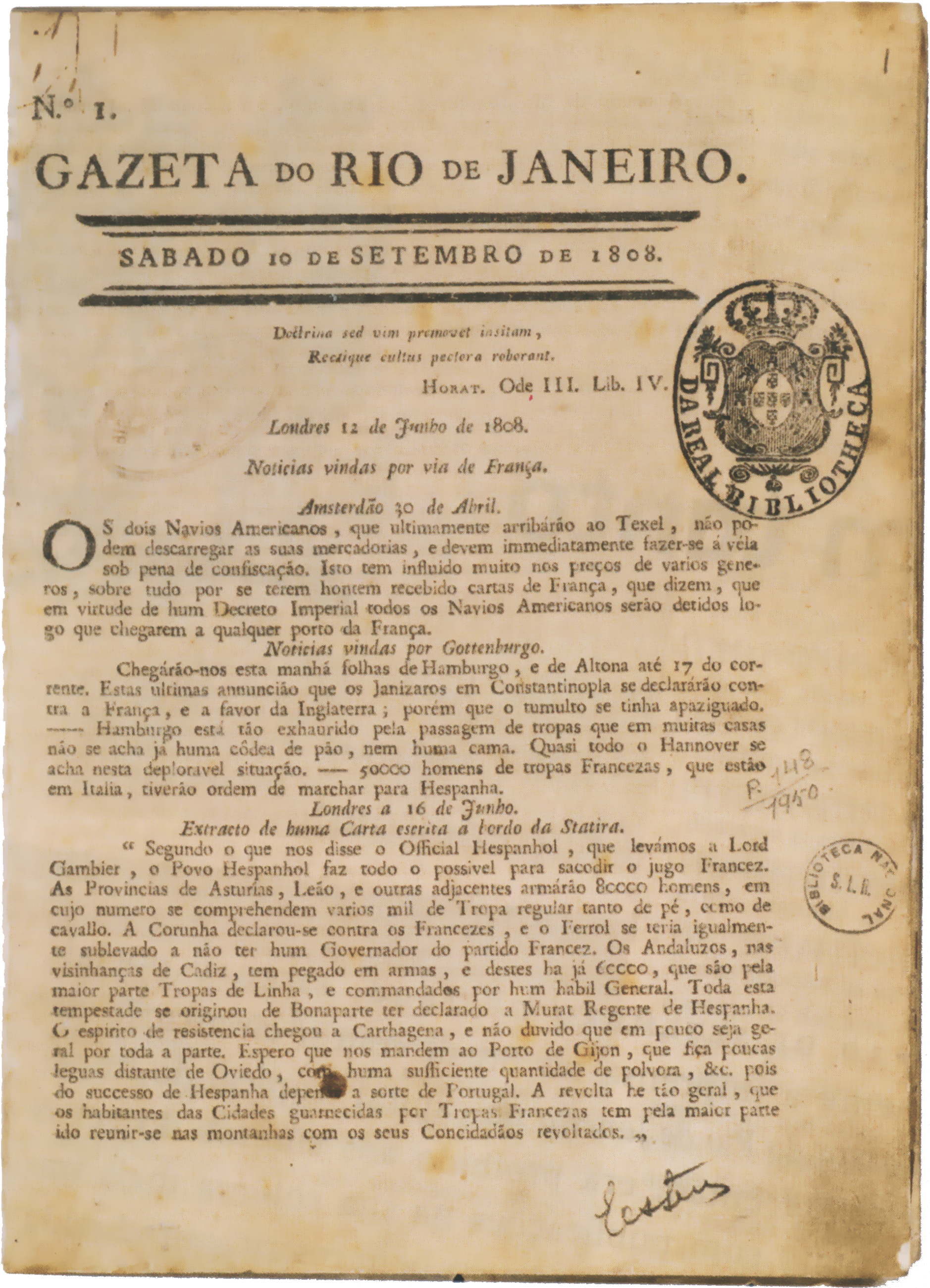
- Page 1 of 10 September 1808 edition of the Paper
- Type: Biweekly
- Founded: 10 September 1808.
- Language: Portuguese
- Headquarters: Rio de Janeiro, Brazil

Gazeta do Rio de Janeiro was the first newspaper to be published in Brazil. It was printed twice a week. It was pro government for the then Portuguese rulers of Brazil. Its editor was Friar José Tiburcio Rocha. It was renamed Gazeta in 1821 and shutdown after Brazil got Independence.
