= Rodrigo de Sousa Coutinho, 1st Count of Linhares =

Portuguese nobleman and politician

Rodrigo de Sousa Coutinho
- Count of Linhares
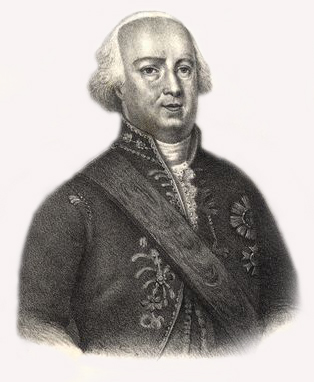

Count of Linhares
- Full name: Rodrigo de Sousa Coutinho
- Born: 4 August 1755; Chaves, Kingdom of Portugal
- Died: 26 January 1812 (aged 56); Rio de Janeiro, Portuguese Empire
- Noble family: de Sousa Coutinho
- Spouse: Gabriella Maria Ignazia Asinari dei Marchesi di San Marzano
- Father: Francisco Inocêncio de Sousa Coutinho, Governor-General of Angola
- Mother: Ana Luísa Joaquina Teixeira da Silva de Andrade

Rodrigo de Sousa Coutinho, 1st Count of Linhares (4 August 1755 – 26 January 1812) was a Portuguese nobleman and politician.

== Life ==
Rodrigo de Sousa Coutinho was born in Chaves on 4 August 1755 to Francisco Inocêncio de Sousa Coutinho, Governor-General of Angola, and Ana Luísa Joaquina Teixeira da Silva de Andrade. His younger brother was Domingos António de Sousa Coutinho, 1st Marquis of Funchal.

He attended the Royal College of Nobles and legal course at Coimbra University. He began his diplomatic career after the death of King Joseph I of Portugal in 1777 as envoy to the court at Turin.

He was recalled to Portugal in 1795 following the death of Martinho de Melo e Castro, to take over the Ministry of the Navy. There, he rendered significant service, continuing the reorganization efforts initiated by his predecessor by establishing the Corps of Construction Engineers and the Naval Treasury Board. Later, upon the death of the Marquis of Ponte de Lima, he was appointed President of the Royal Treasury.

Dismissed from office due to his support for the English alliance, he emigrated to Brazil with the Royal Family and was appointed Minister of Foreign Affairs and War (1808-1812), and also held several other positions.

He died in Rio de Janeiro on 26 January 1812.

=== Marriage and children ===
He married the Italian noblewoman Gabriella Maria Ignazia Asinari on 8 May 1789 and had :

- Vitório Maria Francisco de Sousa Coutinho (1790-1857), 2nd Count of Linhares and Prime Minister of Portugal in 1835.
- Francisco Afonso de Sousa Coutinho (1796-1834)
- Maria Balbina de Sousa Coutinho (born 1800)
