= Domingos António de Sousa Coutinho, 1st Marquis of Funchal =

Portuguese diplomat and author

His Excellency The Marquis of Funchal CvC
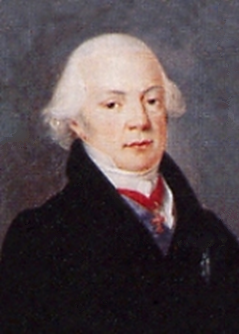
- Born: Domingos António de Sousa Coutinho; 20 February 1762; Chaves, Portugal
- Died: 1 December 1833 (aged 71); Brighton, United Kingdom
- Occupation: Diplomat

D. Domingos António de Sousa Coutinho, 1st Marquis of Funchal (20 February 1762 – 1 December 1833) was a Portuguese diplomat and author of several works on politics and diplomacy.

He read law in the University of Coimbra shortly after the Pombaline Reform, where he earned his degree in 1781. At first his family considered an ecclesiastical career for him, but he instead joined the diplomatic service, filling the posts of envoy in Denmark (1790-1795), Portuguese representative in Turin (1796-1803), ambassador in London (1803-1814) and in Rome (1814-1828). His period as ambassador to the Court of St James's coincided with the height of international conflict during the Napoleonic Wars. He was intensely involved in secret diplomatic negotiations at this time as Portugal openly sided with Britain and refused to join the Continental System; Sousa Coutinho was of significant importance in arranging the details of the transfer of the Portuguese court to Brazil with British Foreign Secretary George Canning, thus guaranteeing British military protection to the Royal Family.

D. Domingos de Sousa Coutinho was born in 1762 to diplomat and colonial administrator D. Francisco Inocêncio de Sousa Coutinho (1726–1780), the son of a second-born of the 10th Count of Redondo, and his wife D. Ana Luísa Joaquina Teixeira de Andrade e Meneses (1731–1778); D. Domingos was the sixth of eight siblings:

- Mariana (born 1752),
- Luísa Margarida (born 1753),
- Rodrigo (1755–1812),
- José António (1757–1817),
- Fernando (born 1760; died young),
- Domingos himself (1762–1833),
- Maria Balbina (1763–1831), and
- Francisco Maurício (1764–1823).

He was baptised on 27 February 1762; his godparents were the Count of Oeiras (who would later become more commonly known by the title of Marquis of Pombal) and Our Lady of the Immaculate Conception, both represented by proxy.

He was graced with the title of Count of Funchal on 17 December 1808; shortly before his death, in June 1833, he was made Marquis of Funchal.

== Distinctions ==
=== National orders ===
- Knight of the Order of Christ (7 October 1788)
