= Separatist movements of Brazil =

Groups seeking independence for states and regions of Brazil

Separatist movements in Brazil are mobilizations that advocate for the independence of certain Brazilian territories, generally based on the concept of self-determination of peoples. Their motivations can be religious, political, cultural, or economic. These movements have been constant throughout Brazil's history, first emerging with the acclamation of Amador Bueno as king of an independent province of São Paulo, and reaching their peak during the Brazilian Empire, but remaining active (albeit with less visibility) to the present day. Among these movements, the only one that succeeded in its secession was the Cisplatine Province after the Cisplatine War, later renamed the Eastern Republic of Uruguay (largely due to external factors, since the small Cisplatine Province could not maintain its sovereignty against Brazil in the same way that Rio Grande do Sul had failed to do so).

According to the first article of the current Brazilian Constitution of 1988, the Federative Republic of Brazil is "formed by the indissoluble union of the states, municipalities, and the Federal District," which makes any movement that has as its objective (directly or indirectly) the dissolution of the Brazilian state unconstitutional. However, Brazilian law itself guarantees the freedom of every citizen to express their ideological beliefs, provided that they do so in accordance with "subconstitutional norms" (no use of firearms, no attacks on public life, no incitement to violence).

Furthermore, international law establishes the right of peoples to self-determination, which differs from the concept of territorial integrity invoked by the state, and the right of a people to claim emancipation from a majority, ratified by Brazil. An unofficial plebiscite, aimed at gauging the opinion of citizens of voting age on the subject, was held in the states of Santa Catarina, Paraná, Rio Grande do Sul, and São Paulo on 1 October 2016.

== History ==
Separatist sentiment has been present since the early days of colonization, notably in the state of Pernambuco, but also in Bahia, Paraíba, and Ceará in the Northeast Region; in the states of São Paulo, Minas Gerais, and Rio de Janeiro in the Southeast Region; and in the states of the South Region (Rio Grande do Sul, Santa Catarina, and Paraná). In Pará in the North Region, there was the Cabanagem, which also had separatist roots, led by a migrant from Ceará.

== São Paulo ==
=== Acclamation of Amador Bueno ===
The acclamation of Amador Bueno as king of São Paulo in the 17th century is believed to have been the first separatist movement in Brazil. With the dual monarchy of the Philippine dynasty, or the Unification of the Portuguese and Spanish Crowns, which began after the Cortes of Tomar, with the proclamation of Philip II of Spain as King of Portugal, the Spanish population increased exponentially in Portuguese colonies such as Brazil, concentrating mainly in São Paulo. The incident is primarily narrated by Pedro Taques de Almeida Paes Leme, but there are doubts about the extent and historicity of this movement.

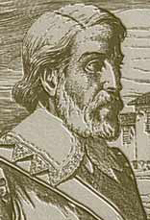
Amador Bueno.

During Spanish rule, the state's residents began to enjoy great wealth from trade between São Paulo and Buenos Aires, and with the War of Restoration of the Portuguese Crown, they feared that Portugal would hinder the hitherto profitable relations between the two provinces. The people of São Paulo did not want to be subjects of King John IV, whom they considered a rebellious vassal of their true Spanish sovereign. They therefore decided to provoke the secession of the São Paulo region from Brazilian territory, hoping to make it a new sovereign nation or annex it to the neighboring Spanish colonies.

According to Afonso E. Taunay, when John IV of Bragança assumed the throne of Portugal in 1640, the following year Amador Bueno da Ribeira was acclaimed king in São Paulo by the powerful party of influential and wealthy Castilians, led by the Rendon de Quevedo brothers, Juan and Francisco Rendón de Quevedo y Luna, natives of Coria, a party to which D. Francisco de Lemos, from the city of Orens; D. Gabriel Ponce de León, from Guaira; D. Bartolomeu de Torales, from Vila Rica do Paraguai, D. André de Zunega and his brother D. Bartolomeu de Contreras y Torales, D. João de Espíndola e Gusmão, from the province of Paraguay, and others who signed the acclamation document on 1 April 1641.

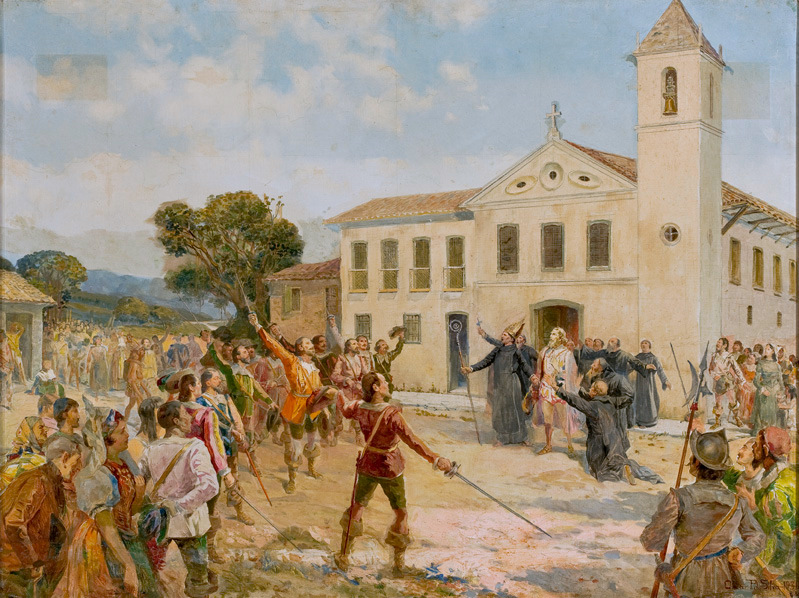
Amador Bueno refused to accept the crown and was pursued by the people of São Paulo, taking refuge in the monastery of São Bento in São Paulo. Oil painting by Oscar Pereira da Silva.

Amador Bueno was acclaimed King of the Paulistas for being the son of a Spaniard and a man of great merit in his republic due to his intelligence, fortune, past as a bandeirante, marriage, and the positions he held.

However, with the sovereign of the House of Bragança restoring the independence of the Portuguese Crown, Portugal armed itself, fortified itself, and defended itself against Spain. The then King of São Paulo reflected on who would arm, defend, and fortify the then kingdom of São Paulo against the Portuguese, and which army would safeguard the king and a kingdom from the easy incorporation of the new state into the domains of Portuguese America.

Having reflected on these contrasts, when surprised by the voices of the Spaniards in front of his house, acclaiming him king, he drew his sword and shouted, with strength and energy: "Royal, royal, by D. João IV, king of Portugal." Faced with this unexpected attitude, the rebels threatened him with death, while the shadows of night began to envelop the sides of the houses and spread through the streets, squares, and slopes.

To save his life, he turned to his Portuguese friends. They ensured his strategic retreat and accompanied him to the monastery of São Bento, where the Benedictines gave him shelter and clothing. The most agitated wanted to break down the convent door. Those who had acclaimed him king now wanted to take his life. Then the high religious authorities appeared at the door of the asylum where Amador Bueno had taken refuge to avoid being killed and managed to calm the turbulent crowd. And the rioters returned to their homes in the moonlit night.

This historical episode served to demonstrate the discontent of São Paulo settlers with Portuguese rule.

== Pernambuco ==
Pernambuco territory in 1709. In Brazil, Pernambuco is the only case of territorial division as punishment for rebellion.

=== Conspiracy of Suassuna ===
The Conspiracy of Suassuna was a revolt that took place in Olinda at the dawn of the 19th century.

Influenced by the ideas of the Enlightenment and the French Revolution, some people, including Manuel Arruda da Câmara—a member of the Literary Society of Rio de Janeiro—founded Brazil's first Masonic lodge, Areópago de Itambé, in the Pernambuco municipality of Itambé in 1796, in which no Europeans participated. The same ideas were also discussed by priests and students at the Olinda Seminary, founded by Bishop José Joaquim da Cunha de Azeredo Coutinho on 16 February 1800. Among the members of this institution was Father Miguelinho, one of those who would later be involved in the Pernambucan revolution of 1817.

=== Pernambucan revolution ===
The Pernambucan revolution, also known as the "Revolution of the Priests," broke out on 6 March 1817, in what was then the Captaincy of Pernambuco. Among its causes, the influence of Enlightenment ideas propagated by Masonic societies, Portuguese monarchical absolutism, and the enormous expenses of the Royal Family and its entourage, newly arrived in Brazil, stand out – the Government of Pernambuco was obliged to send large sums of money to Rio de Janeiro to pay for the salaries, food, clothing, and parties of the Court, which made it difficult to deal with local problems (such as the drought that occurred in 1816) and caused delays in the payment of soldiers, generating great discontent among the people of Pernambuco and Brazil. The movement was led by Domingos José Martins, with the support of the clergymen Father João Ribeiro, Father Miguelinho, Father Roma, Vicar Tenório, Friar Caneca, and also Antônio Carlos Ribeiro de Andrada (brother of José Bonifácio), José de Barros Lima, Cruz Cabugá, José Luiz de Mendonça, and Gervásio Pires, among others.

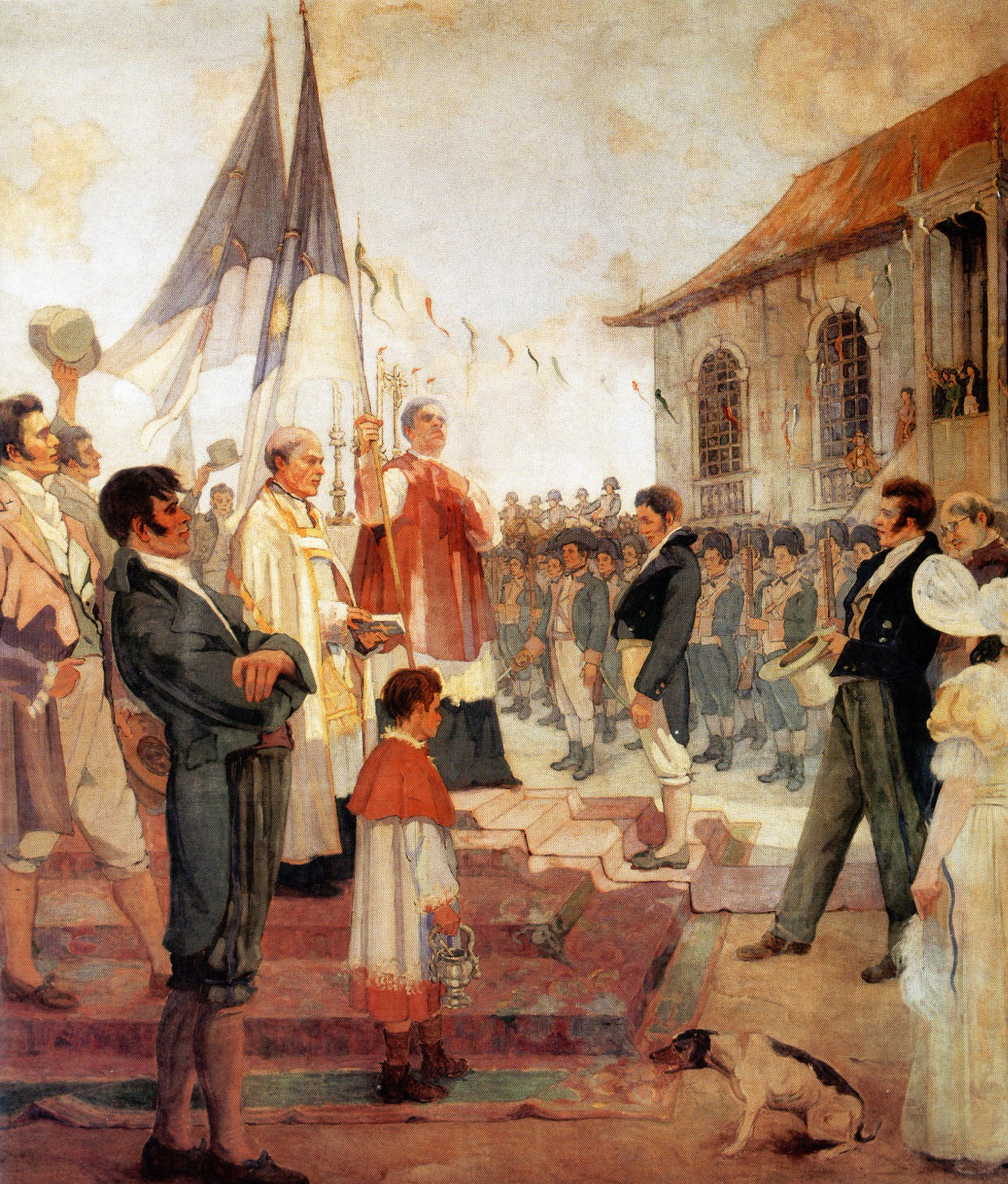
Pernambucan revolution, the only libertarian movement during the period of Portuguese rule that went beyond the conspiratorial stage.

At the beginning of the 19th century, Pernambuco was the richest captaincy in Colonial Brazil. Recife and Olinda, the two largest cities in Pernambuco, had a combined population of around 40,000 (Rio de Janeiro, the capital of the colony, had 60,000 inhabitants). The port of Recife shipped sugar—from hundreds of engenhos in the Zona da Mata region, whose coastline stretched from the mouth of the São Francisco River to the village of Goiana—and cotton. In addition to their economic and political importance, the people of Pernambuco had participated in several struggles for freedom. The first and most important had been the Pernambuco insurrection in 1645. Later, during the Mascates War, the possibility of proclaiming the independence of Olinda was raised.

The repression of the Pernambucan revolution was bloody. Many rebels were hanged and/or shot, their bodies mutilated after death. Others died in prison. Father João Ribeiro committed suicide, but his body was dug up, quartered, and his head displayed in the public square. An episode that moved even the executioners was that of Vicar Tenório, who was hanged and beheaded, had his hands cut off, and his body dragged through the streets of Recife. Also in retaliation, the district of Alagoas, whose rural landowners had remained loyal to the Crown, was separated from Pernambuco with the approval of John VI of Portugal. As a reward, they were allowed to form an independent captaincy.

=== Confederation of the Equator ===
The Confederation of the Equator was a revolutionary movement, of an emancipationist (or autonomist) and republican nature, which broke out in Pernambuco and spread to other provinces in northeastern Brazil. It represented the main reaction against the absolutist tendencies and centralizing policies of Emperor Pedro I (1822–1831), outlined in the Charter of 1824, the country's first Constitution.

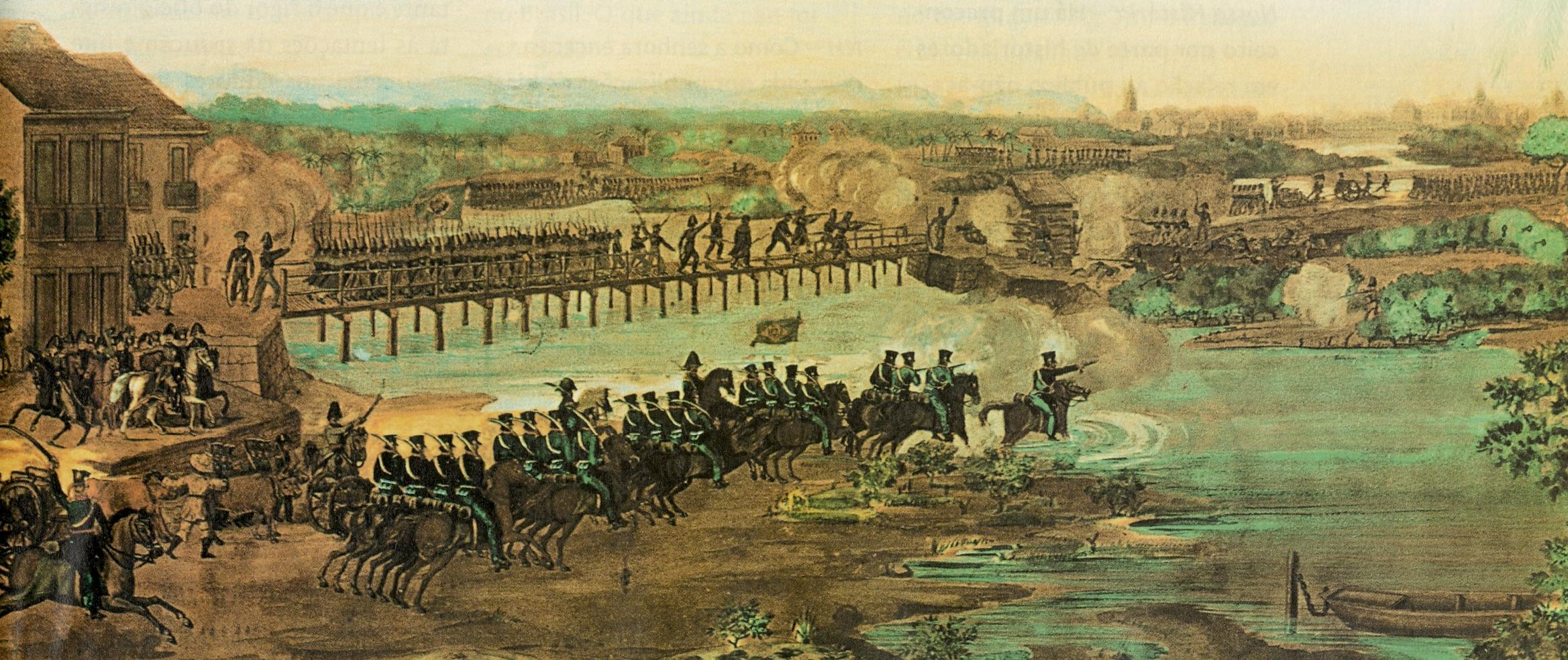
The Imperial Army of Brazil attacks Confederate forces in Recife, Pernambuco province, 1824, in the context of the Confederation of the Equator.

Even after Brazil's independence, Pedro I remained tied to the interests of the Portuguese Crown and was sympathetic to a proposal made by his father, John VI, to recreate the United Kingdom based on a formula that would grant Brazil broad autonomy, because this would preserve his rights to the Portuguese throne. The formula, however, was seen by many Pernambucans as an attempt at recolonization. In addition, the province of Pernambuco resented paying high taxes to the Empire, which justified them as necessary to carry on the post-independence provincial wars (some provinces resisted separation from Portugal). Pernambuco hoped that the first Constitution of the Empire would be federalist in nature and would give the provinces autonomy to resolve their issues.

The repression of the movement was severe. The emperor requested loans from England and hired foreign troops, who marched on Recife under the command of Thomas Cochrane. The rebels were subdued, and several leaders of the revolt, such as Frei Caneca, were hanged or shot. Also in retaliation, Pedro I separated the extensive district of Rio de São Francisco (now western Bahia) from the territory of Pernambuco by decree on 7 July 1824, transferring it initially to Minas Gerais and later to Bahia. This was the last portion of land to be separated from Pernambuco, imposing a significant reduction in the province's territorial extension, from 250,000 km^{2} to 98,000 km^{2}.

=== Praieira revolt ===
The Praieira revolt, also known as the "Praieira insurrection," "Praieira revolution," or simply "Praieira," was a liberal and separatist movement that broke out during the Second reign in the province of Pernambuco between 1848 and 1850. The last of the provincial revolts is linked to the political party struggles that marked the Regency period and the beginning of the Second reign. Its defeat represented a show of strength by the government of Pedro II (1840–1889).

The Brazilian monarchy was strongly contested by the new liberal ideas of the time. In addition to discontent with the imperial government, much of the population of Pernambuco was dissatisfied with the concentration of land ownership and political power in the province, the most important in the Northeast. It was in this context that the Beach Party emerged, created to oppose the Liberal Party and the Conservative Party, both dominated by two powerful families who were constantly making political deals with each other. There were a series of power struggles until, on 7 November 1848, armed conflict broke out. In Olinda, the Praia leaders launched the "Manifesto to the World" and began fighting against the imperial government's troops, which intervened and put an end to the largest insurrection that occurred during the Second reign.

== South Region ==
Flag of Juliana Republic.

Separatist ideas have been present throughout the history of the South Region, to the point that the issue is no longer just political but has also become cultural. In the state of Rio Grande do Sul and in many municipalities in Santa Catarina, the Farroupilha Revolution is officially celebrated. During the week of 20 September, the anniversary of the revolution, the various Gaúcho Tradition Centers scattered throughout the South celebrate the date by commemorating the merits of this separatist uprising. The flag of Rio Grande do Sul itself still bears the inscription "República Rio-Grandense" (Riograndense Republic) in the style of the flag created for the new country. In Santa Catarina, the revolutionary Anita Garibaldi is considered a heroine of the state, and there is no shortage of statues, streets, and squares named in her honor. Every year, the city of Laguna celebrates the reenactment of the Capture of Laguna, the event that declared the Juliana Republic during the Farroupilha Revolution.

=== Contestado War ===
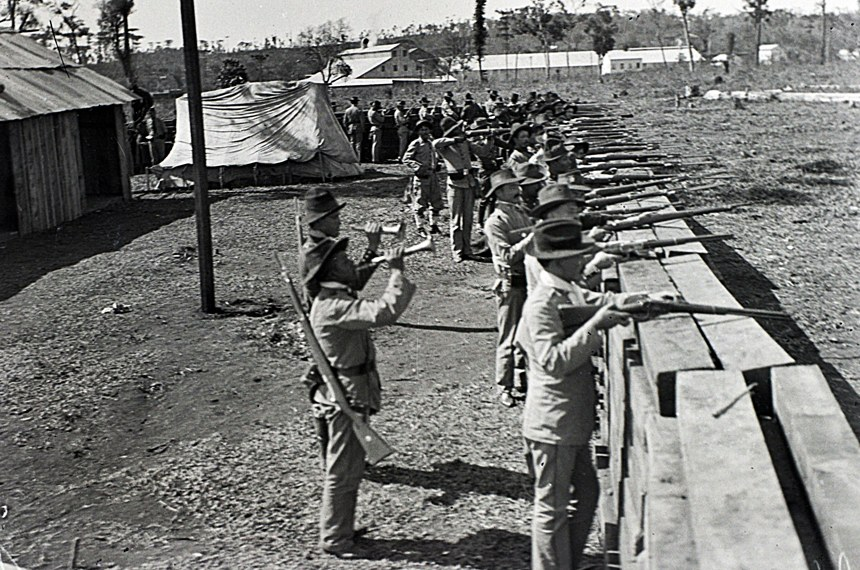

Also during the Contestado War, which took place in the Contestado Region between Paraná and Santa Catarina, a "celestial monarchy" was declared by the insurgents.

=== Ragamuffin War ===
Riograndense Republic flag.

The Ragamuffin War or Farroupilha Revolution are the names given to the revolution or regional war, republican in nature, against the imperial government of Brazil in the then province of São Pedro do Rio Grande do Sul, which resulted in the province's declaration of independence as a republican state, giving rise to the Riograndense Republic. It lasted from 20 September 1835, to 1 March 1845.

== Minas Gerais ==
=== Inconfidência Mineira ===
The Inconfidência Mineira ("Minas Gerais Conspiracy"), also known as the Conjuração Mineira, was an attempt at a separatist revolt in the then captaincy of Minas Gerais, in the State of Brazil, against, among other reasons, the imposition of taxes and Portuguese rule. It was suppressed by the Portuguese Crown in 1789.

== Bahia ==
=== Bahian Conspiracy ===
The Bahian Conspiracy, also known as the Tailors' Revolt (since its leaders were tailors) and more recently as the Búzios Revolt, was an emancipationist movement that took place at the end of the 18th century in the then Captaincy of Bahia, in the State of Brazil.

=== Guanais Federation ===
The Guanais Federation (also called the Guanais Revolt or Federalist Revolution) was a nativist revolution that took place in Bahia in 1832, in the villages of São Félix and Cachoeira, with a minor recurrence in 1833, constituting one of the seeds that led to the larger revolt of 1837, known as the Sabinada.

=== Malê revolt ===
The so-called Malê revolt took place on the night of 24-25 January 1835, in the city of Salvador, capital of the then province of Bahia, Brazil. However, there are doubts about the separatist nature of the revolution, which is seen by many historians as a movement seeking social improvements and the end of slavery.

=== Sabinada ===
The Sabinada was an autonomist revolt that took place between 6 November 1837 and 16 March 1838, in the then Province of Bahia, during the Brazilian Empire.

== Rio de Janeiro ==
=== Rio de Janeiro Conspiracy ===
Conjuração Fluminense was the name given to the repression of an association of intellectuals who gathered in Rio de Janeiro around a literary society at the end of the 18th century. This repression took place in 1794 at the Literary Society of Rio de Janeiro.

== Contemporary separatist movements ==
=== Active movements ===
Amazon

- Proposed state: Republic of the Peoples of the Amazon (corresponds to Acre, Amapá, Amazonas, Pará, Rondônia, and Roraima)
- Lobby group: Movimento Amazônia Independente (MAI)

Northeast

- Proposed states: Confederate States of the Equator (corresponds to Alagoas, Bahia, Ceará, Maranhão, Paraíba, Pernambuco, Piauí, Rio Grande do Norte, and Sergipe), New Lusitania Union (corresponds to Ceará, Pernambuco, Paraíba, and Rio Grande do Norte)
- Lobby groups: Nordeste Independente (NEI), Nordeste Oriental

São Paulo

- Proposed state: São Paulo Republic
- Lobby groups: Movimento República de São Paulo (MRSP), Movimento São Paulo Independente (MSPI)

South

- Proposed state: Independence or confederation between Paraná, Rio Grande do Sul, and Santa Catarina.
- Lobby groups: The South Is My Country, Legião Sul

=== Inactive movements ===
- National Alliance: Political organization of separatist movements in Brazil, created by Flavio Cimonari Rebello, from São Paulo, in 2016. It was formed to be the embryo of a political party and to reform the Constitution in its first article, which establishes the indissoluble union of the Brazilian Federation. In addition to the movements already mentioned above, it was formed from the following:
  - Espírito Santo é o Meu País
  - Grupo do Estudo e Avaliação Pernambuco Independente (GEAPI)
  - O Rio é o Meu País
  - Roraima é o Meu País
  - São Paulo Livre
- Grupo de Estudos para o Nordeste Independente (GESNI): Created in 1992 in Recife by Jacques Ribemboim, it advocates for the autonomy of Brazil's Northeast Region. In 2002, it ceased its activities and gave way to Nordeste Independente (NEI).
- Movimento pela Independência do Pampa (MIP): Created in 1990 by Irton Marx, it advocates for the separation of the state of Rio Grande do Sul.
- Movimento São Paulo para os Paulistas: Created in 2010, it fights for the right of São Paulo residents to defend their cultural values and against the various forms of offenses committed against the people of São Paulo.

== See also ==
- Politics of Brazil
- Federative units of Brazil
- Subdivisions of Brazil
- Proposed federative units of Brazil
