= Pernambucan revolution =

Separatist movement that took place in the province of Pernambuco in 1817

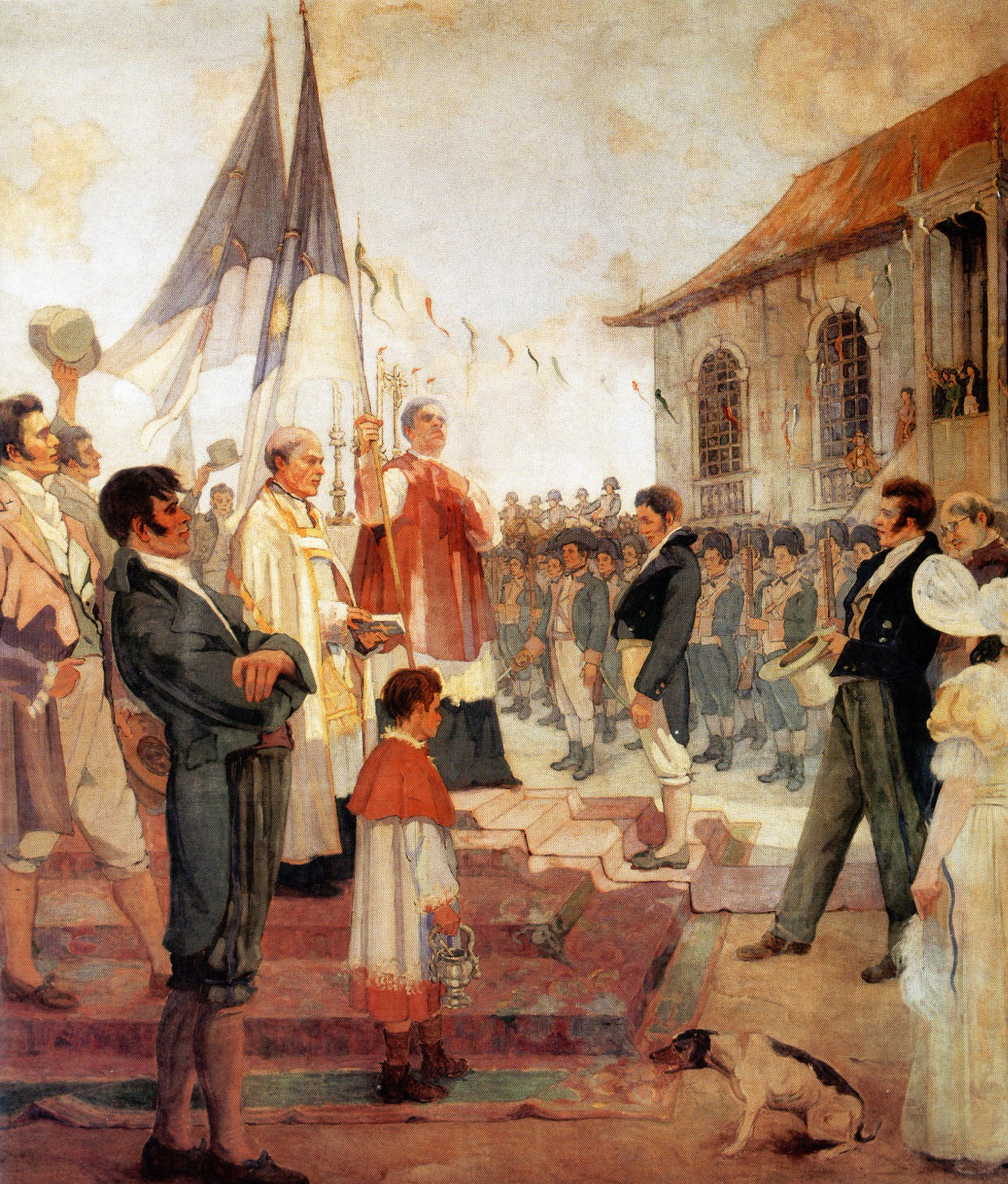
- Blessing of the Flags of the 1817 Revolution, by Antônio Parreiras
Date	1817
Location	Captaincy of Pernambuco, Kingdom of Brazil
Result	Portuguese victory

Belligerents
United Kingdom of Portugal, Brazil and the Algarves	Rebels of Pernambuco and allies from Paraíba and Ceará.

Commanders and leaders
King John VI; Count of Arcos	Domingos Martins (executed); Antônio Carlos; Frei Caneca

The Pernambucan revolution, also known as the Priest's Revolution or Seventeen, occurred in the Captaincy of Pernambuco in the Northeastern region of Brazil, and was sparked mainly by the decline of sugar production rates and the influence of the Freemasonry in the region. Other important reasons for the revolt include: the ongoing struggle for the independence of Spanish colonies all over in South America; the independence of the United States; the generally liberal ideas that came through all of Brazil the century before, including many French Philosophers, such as Montesquieu and Rousseau; the actions of secret societies, which insisted on the liberation of the colony; the development of a distinct culture in Pernambuco.

The movement was led by Domingos José Martins, with the support of Antônio Carlos Ribeiro de Andrada and Frei Caneca. The Consulate General of the United States in Recife, America's oldest diplomatic post in the Southern Hemisphere, publicly supported the Pernambucan revolutionaries.

This revolution is also notable for being one of the first attempts to establish an independent government in Brazil, as it was preceded by the Inconfidência Mineira.

Contrasting with the Inconfidência Mineira, that at its demise culminated in the killing of a lower class white man (Tiradentes) or the Revolt of the Tailors, whose leaders that were killed were mostly black young men, the Pernambucan revolt ended up with the killing of white, higher-class ringleaders.

== Background ==
The revolt can be traced from the presence of the Portuguese royal family in Brazil, which mostly benefited the plantation owners, merchants and bureaucrats of the Central and Southern regions of the country. The inhabitants of other regions, namely the Northeast, were not satisfied by the monarch's stay, given that southern Brazilians generally had knowledge of the favors and new privileges conceded to them by the Portuguese monarch from which they had received great wealth. The northern Brazilians were generally separated from the monarch, and the benefits thereof, but, at the same time, had the responsibility to support him.

Another group not content with the politics of the King John VI of Portugal and Brazil were military officials of Brazilian descent. In order to protect the cities and provide aid in military actions in French Guiana and in the region of Prata, John brought troops from Portugal in order to organize military forces reserving the highest military ranks for the Portuguese nobility. Because of this, the level of taxes steadily rose as the colony was forced to maintain the expenditures of the military campaigns.

The historical analyst, Maria Odila Silva Dias, remarked that "in order to cover the costs of installing public works and civil servants, taxes on the export of sugar, tobacco and leather were increased, creating a series of troubles that directly affected the capitanias of the North, which the Court did not hesitate to burden with the violence of recruitment and with contributions to cover the expenses of war in the kingdom, in Guiana and in the Prata region. For the governors and functionaries of various capitanias, turning to Lisboa or to Rio was the same thing."

Another factor was the conception of "Brazil". Until then, "Brazil" was a generic name to several Portuguese possessions on the New World, and even the United States referred to those possessions as plural, "Brazils'". The United Kingdom of Portugal, Brazil and the Algarves was recently declared in 1815, and for the first time Brazil was seen as part of one kingdom. In general, the provincial matters were prevalent over national matters, and the idea of a "Brazilian people" did not exist.

== Troubles in the Northeast ==
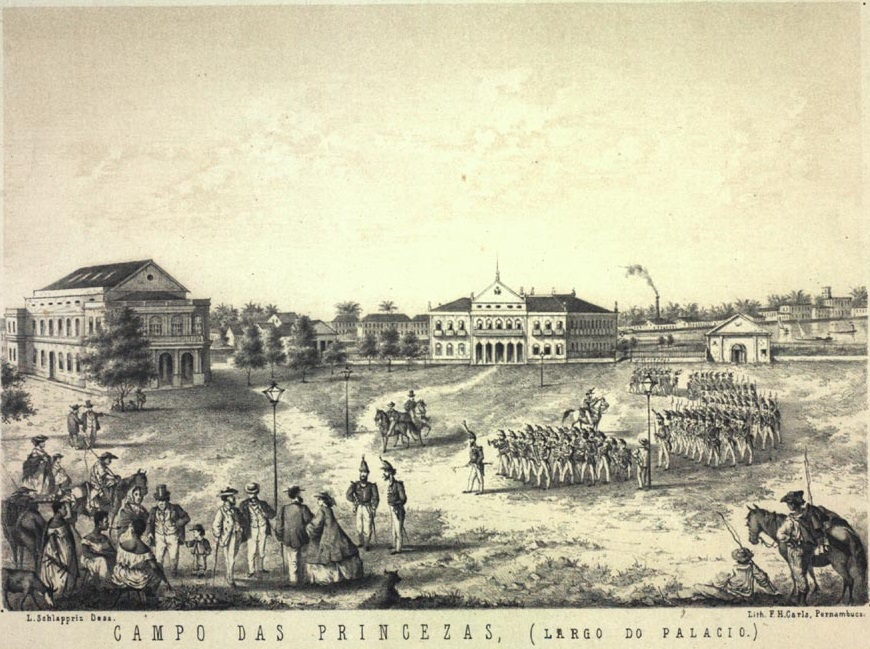
Wood carving depicting Recife when taken by Pernambucan rebels.

The Northeastern region had already been affected by a famine causing a blow to cotton and sugar production in 1816, and creating another reason for the fervent desire for independence. In Recife, the capital of Pernambuco, and in the principal ports of the region, this desire and a general feeling of hostility toward the Portuguese was particularly extreme. The general sentiment was described as the "Portuguese of New Lisbon" exploit and oppress the "Pernambucan patriots".

Liberal ideas that entered Brazil by way of foreign travelers, books, and other sources incited the revolutionaries. Also, secret societies had formed from the end of the 18th century, often in the form of Masonic Lodges, several of which, such as Patriotismo, and Restauração, had existed in Pernambuco – all of which served as locations for the spreading and general discussion of the so-called "infamous French ideas", coming from the French Revolution. The Northern Lodges, including the ones of Pernambuco, were of English tradition and advocated for the implementation of a republic in Brazil. They had a quarrel of the Fluminense and Portuguese Lodges, of French tradition, that advocated for the implementation of a constitutional monarchy.

Initially, the Governor of Pernambuco Caetano Pinto was seen as a good administrator and a reasonable and just man, that listened to both the royalty and the population. But in from 1808 on, he became known amongst the population for being weak, corrupt, a bad administrator and responsible for excessive taxes.

== Preparation ==
Several testimonies affirm the revolt was being planned for at least 10 years in masonic lodges, specially in the houses of Domingos José Martins, João Ribeiro Pessoa de Melo Montenegro, Antônio Gonçalves da Cruz and Vicente Peixoto. In 1816, The Masonic Lodges intensively spread political propaganda in Pernambuco. The Government made several attempts to stop them. The revolt was planned specially by the descendants of the War of the Mascates, that in few generations became one of the most powerful social class in Brazil. The Freemasons attempted to raise hostility amongst the Portuguese and Pernambucans and to get support from the Clergy, the local elite and the armed forces, that showed support for the conspirators. In total, from 43 to 70 clergy men took part of the revolution. They were inspired by the theology of illustration, that went accordingly to the reforms made by Marquis of Pombal. Despite their strong support in favor of the local elites, ony a fraction of the engenho owners supported Freemasons, but several of them showed support after the start of the revolt.

The two main masonic lodges in Pernambuco were the Academies of Cabo and Paraíso, that substituted the Areopagus Lodge, dissolved in 1801 after the Conspiracy of Suassuna. The Fluminense Freemasons were being systematically excluded from the republican groups. They were aware of their differences with the Pernambucan Freemasons and nominated Antônio Carlos as ombudsman of Olinda to control them.

Several people involved with the revolution, including their leaders, studied on University of Coimbra. Inside of the university, students debated literature that was forbitten in Portugal, including books from the illuminist philosophers Rousseau, Montesquieu, Voltaire, Helvétius and Diderot. Many clergymen that studied at the Seminary of Olinda were also supporters of the liberal ideas. Secret meetings were held inside churches, clubs, military facilities, and other private social spaces. There, radical political ideas were debated and forbitten literature was read. The pasquinades written on those meetings were spread on the walls of the city. Amongst the forbitten literature studied by the republicans were the French Constitutions of 1791, 1793 and 1795 and The Constitutions of the Free-Masons, by Benjamin Franklin.

Despite the adherence of the elites, their ideals were not nearly as much spread to the population. There were many troops from Dom João VI in the streets, and as consequence the republican ideals were mainly discussed in private spaces. Several people that partook on the revolt did not know they were fighting against the Portuguese royalty, as they felt it was an insurrection against a bad administrator, and were waiting for a better person to be named as Governor by Dom João VI. The masonic leaders would only talk about the independence of Pernambuco amongst the initiated, hiding crucial information from the so-called "mongrels". Slaves were already organized, waiting for a chance to act. The revolutionaries sent agents to several captaincies, including Bahia and Rio de Janeiro, in hope of convincing them to join the revolution. The news were also spread through merchants.

In 1816, a slave reported the Tenants José Paulino de Almeida e Albuquerque and Antonio Vieira Cavalcante to the authorities. The slave was freed and Albuquerque and Cavalcante were arrested on the Snake Island, being later freed on 14 February. In 1817, the government suspected the Franciscan friar Antônio das Neves was one of the responsible for spreading political propaganda in Pernambuco.

The Pernambucan revolt happened almost simultaneously with other Freemason conspiracies on Rio de Janeiro, Lisbon and Bahia. On Lisbon, the Portuguese Royalty discovered a Plot to substitute the Braganca for the Cadaval. On Bahia, Marcos de Noronha e Brito was accused of betraying Dom João VI, and plans were made in Recife to split Brazil in five different kingdoms. On Rio, there was a plan of forcing Dom João VI to sign a new Constitution.

== The Revolt ==
=== Beginning ===
It is believed the revolt was scheduled to 16 March 1817. Shortly before the revolt, Domingos José Martins and the priest João Ribeiro ended relationships with the Tenant Colonel Alexandre Tomás, a fellow Freemason probably from the French rite.

Governor Caetano Pinto received a report about the conspiracy on 1 March, given by the ombudsman from Comarca do Sertão José da Cruz Ferreira, that heard about the conspiracy through Manuel de Carvalho Medeiros. On 4 March, he made his troops swear obedience to the monarchy and the harmony between Brazilians and Portuguese and on 5 March he made a speech to the Recife population, saying that Brazil would be elevated to a united kingdom and all of them obeyed the same king.

On 6 March, he issued an arrest order to several Freemasons of the English rite. Amongst the accused were three artillery captains, Domingos Teotônio Pessoa de Melo, José de Barros Lima and Pedro da Silva Pedroso, the tenant-secretary José Mariano de Albuquerque and the infantryman Manuel de Souza Teixeira. José Roberto Pereira da Silva was responsible for the arrest of the civils involved and the commanders of each regiment were responsible for the military. Marshall Manuel Joaquim Barbosa de Castro assembled his troops and accused the insurgents of being "agitators". Brigadeer Domingos Teotônio Jorge sent Captain Antônio José Vitoriano to arrest the accused on Forte de São Tiago das Cinco Pontas, but Captain Manoel Joaquim Barbosa de Castro went instead, but he was murdered by Lima with a sword strike. Most of the officials unleashed their swords in support of the conspirators and two Portuguese officials fled. According to Antônio Joaquim de Melo's registers of the memories of his friend José da Natividade Saldanha, Barbosa's death happened at about 2 pm.

The streets were taken few minutes later, over the sounds of bells. Caetano Pinto sent an emissary, that was shot dead. Tennant Antônio Henriques was sent to release Domingos José Martins and other prisoners from jail. Meanwhile, Captain Manuel D'Azevedo was sent to negotiate the freedom of the military personnel stuck on Forte de São Tiago das Cinco Pontas. Father Dias Martins already joined troops for the occasion. Francisco Pais Barreto joined Martin's militias with 600 slaves.

At 4 pm, Caetano Pinto sent troops led by José Roberto Pereira da Silva while he and his family fled to Forte de São João Batista do Brum. On 7 March, José Mariano was sent to Olinda and the militias of Father Dias Martins and Domingos Teotônio Jorge, made out of 800 men, surrounded the fort. The lawer José Luiz de Mendonça sent an ultimatum signed by Domingos Teotônio Jorge, João Ribeiro and Domingos José Martins. Caetano Pinto signed, thus renouncing his post as governor, and the revolutionaries made arrangements for him to be transported to Rio de Janeiro.

Many black men joined the Republicans during the revolt. Several slaves fled to Quilombo do Catucá, on Catucá woods, near Beberibe River.

During the revolt, several proclamations and documents were emitted containing insulting words and praising their liberty. Up until that moment, the press was censored by the crown. Several royalty symbols were destroyed, and a white flag was waved in replacement of the flag of the kingdom.

=== Provisional government ===
Shortly after, Martins organized elections for the Provincial Government of the Republic. Elections were barely unseen in Brazil, as they only happened to choose aldermen to the municipal chambers. Most of the candidates for the new government were tied to the local elites, but there were exceptions, such as Joaquim Ramos de Almeida and Tomás Antônio Ferreira Vila Nova, tied to subordinate groups.

The troops marched to Casa do Erário, where the voting process happened, and chose the electoral college. It was composed of Luiz Francisco de Paula Cavalcanti de Albuquerque, José Inácio Ribeiro de Abreu e Lima, Joaquim Ramos de Almeida, Francisco de Brito Bezerra Cavalcanti de Albuquerque, Joaquim José Vaz Salgado, Antônio Joaquim Ferreira de S. Paio, Francisco de Paula Cavalcanti, Felipe Nery Ferreira, Joaquim d'Anunciação e Siqueira, Tomás Ferreira Vila Nova, José Maria de Vasconcelos Bourbon, Francisco de Paula Cavalcanti Júnior, Tomás José Alves de Siqueira, João de Albuquerque Maranhão and João Marinho Falcão.

João Ribeiro Pessoa de Melo Montenegro, Domingos Teotônio Jorge Martins Pessoa, Domingos José Martins, José Luís de Mendonça and Manoel Correia de Araújo were elected as representants of the new government. They were chosen as a way to represent the most important social classes at a time: commerce, military, clergy, alphabetized and land-owners.

On 9 March, the leaders of the revolt signed the "Preciso" manifesto, written by José Luís Mendonça. The work accused Caetano Pinto of helping the court to oppress the rights of the Pernambucans and declared their intentions of creating a Provisional government chosen by 17 people. The document served as a provisional Constitution, as the leaders did not have time to write a proper one.

According to the Government, they would represent the Executive and Legislative powers until the approval of a proper Constitution, and if the Constitution was not approved in one year, the power would be given back to the people. The Executive power was controlled by the elected members of the Provisional Government. The Legislative power was controlled by six people chosen by the Municipalities, as long as they were patriots and good administrators, and were not relatives up second degree with the Secretary of Estate of Internal and External Matters, the Treasury Inspector and the Bishop. The government was helped by a Council, and any matters should be decided with the majority of the votes, but only the Government could sign laws. The presidency of the Government changed weekly, and their members had parliamentary immunity, except for the secretaries. Until the approval of the Constitution, governmental roles such as the Treasury Inspector answered to the Government.

The Judiciary was composed of two Ordinary Judges, one for criminal matters and other for civil matters, already in function prior to the revolt. Their decisions could be appealed to the Supreme College of Justice, made up by five lifetime members, that could only be substituted with a criminal sentence. The role of ombudsman was extinguished, with his functions being delegated to the Ordinary Judges. Military crimes were dealt with a separate institution. For the time, the old laws were applied, until a National Law was approved.

The official religion of the estate was Catholicism, and the clergy was paid by the estate. Despite that, there would be tolerance for religious dissidencies.

For the Municipalities, the old bicameral system was maintained.

People that chose to naturalize on the new estate, including foreginers, as long as they were Christians and accepted by a governmental act, would be granted a governmental job.

Manuel José Pereira Caldas was asked to write the text of the Constitution, but he delegated the role to Antônio Carlos. A sketch of the new Constitution was approved by the Provisional Government on 29 March. There were doubts about the inclusion free blacks on the representative system.

The new law code was called Lei Orgânica da República (Organic Law of the Republic), based on the popular sovereignty and liberalism. The Law guaranteed for the first time individual rights and predicted punishment for governmental agents that acted against it. The government emitted the "Declaration of Natural, Civil and Political Rights of Men" together with "Preciso" to respawn their decisions. One of the first laws approved by the Provisional Government was an amnesty law. The new Legal Code should be voted by the Municipalities through assemblies; a way of avoiding the conservative bicameral system of creating a counter-revolution. The assemblies happened in Recife, Olinda, and Iguaraçu, but they were suspended due allegations of sabotage by the "enemies of the liberal cause", that were supposedly using religious ceremonies to convince the population that the revolutionaries wanted to destroy religion and free the slaves.

On economic matters, the Provisional Government incentivised agriculture over commerce. Amongst their actions was the abolishment of the interest from the Companhia Geral de Comércio de Pernambuco e Paraíba in 1780, as long as the debt was paid in two years. They were also concerned with subsistence agriculture, and incentivised the small land owners that were part of their militias to return to their lands.

Immediately after the election, the new junta raised the wages of the military and abolished some taxes. Part of the leadership and the main supporters of the revolt wanted to create a constitutional monarchy, but they were the minority and were disincentivized by the Military and their peers. José Luís de Mendonça proposed the negotiation with the Portuguese Court for the reduction of taxes and the limitation of power from the Governors, but Domingos José Martins repudiated his ideas and expressed his wishes of killing him. From there on, José Luís de Mendonça was isolated from the provisional government. Manoel Correia de Araújo was sympathetic of Mendonça's ideas, but he decided to abstain from further commentaries. Antônio Carlos tried to support the negotiation with the Crown, but he was persuated by Domingos José Martins and João Ribeiro.

On 9 March, Father João Cavalcanti de Albuquerque donated several of his personal goods, all made of silver, and goods from the Church of Santo Antônio do Cabo to help financing the government.

=== Communication strategies ===
After the Government was established, there were much more effords to spread the republican ideals to the population. The government used communication strategies inherited from the colonial times, such as bando, where a declaration was read on the streets to the sound of battery.

The press was also used. Up until that moment, there were only two official typographies in Brazil, one in Rio de Janeiro and another in Bahia. One typography, from Ricardo Fernandes Catanho, was on its way to be officialized in Recife, but the revolution halted the due legal process. As a consequence, the first Pernambucan typography was arranged by the revolutionaries. The Government declared freedom of speech on the revolting estates. The republicans used Officina Typographica da República de Pernambuco 2ª Vez Restaurada, the publishing house of the English James Pinche, to print pro-government proclamations. As there were no typhographers, the work was done by Pinche himself and one French sailor. Another pro-government outlet published was O Preciso, edited by José Luiz de Mendonça.

=== Spread ===
Dom Antônio de São José Bastos, the Bishop of Olinda, was absent from Pernambuco since 1815 for his episcopal congregation and his attributions were passed to three priests, with Bernardo Luiz Ferreira Portugal being their highest authority. With the beginning of the revolution, they published "Proclamação da Cúria de Olinda em defesa da República de 1817" ("Proclamation of The Curia of Olinda in defense of the Republic of 1817"), supporting the revolutionaries. Priests were instructed to convince their peers and congregations to join the revolution. They declared that Satan fooled men to follow a king they did not choose. In Vila do Conde, some men tried to erase the royal symbols on the villa's pelourinho with lime. The clergy men partook in several roles in the Provisional Government and army, and some convents were used for military training.

On 6 March, Captains and militias from Igaracy, Goiana and Itamaracá marched to Recife in support of the revolt. The regions of mata seca and várzea do Paraíba also showed support, but mata úmida partook on counter-revolutionary actions. May people from Cabo Village came to Recife, filling the streets.

The sugar and cotton producers from Mata Norte and Parnaíba quickly showed support for the revolt, but not the producers from Mata Sul. They did send militias to Recife, but the new republic suffered resistance on the region up until the end. The Provisional Government confiscated 44 engenhos from conservative land-owners. Francisco Pais Barreto, one of the most powerful landowners from the region, joined the revolt with the objective of controlling the rural militias. The Alencar family and André de Albuquerque Maranhão also showed support.

The revolt extended to Ceará, Paraíba and to Rio Grande. According to a letter sent by João Ribeiro to the Provisiory Government of Paraíba on 31 March 1817, there were intentions of creating a Republic amongst them, with the capital being located in Pernaíba, the center of the new republic. The Provisional Government hoped the South of Brazil would eventually join the revolution, but in case that did not happen, the North would be easier to persuade for being further away from the Crown, and the new state would be able to maintain itself independent. But, despite their intentions of creating a republic, the other states feared of being subordinated to Pernambuco.

Domingos Teotônio Jorge was the responsible for gathering support in Bahia before the revolt. Marcos de Noronha Brito forbade the Freemasons and created a net of spies on Bay of All Saints to avoid news from the revolt to reach the Captaincy. Padre Roma helped to declare independency on Sirinhaém and was sent together with his son to the captaincy disguised as coconut sellers to straighten their bonds, but he was arrested as soon as they arrived on Itapoã Beach on 26 March, together with and two jangadeiros. In one version, there was a troop already waiting for them. In other version, they were identified by the tavern owner Simplício Manoel da Costa and arrested. Before his arrest, he managed to destroy several sensible documents, including the proclamations called "Denodados patriotas baianos". They were executed with arquebus shots three days later on Campo de Santana. His death was notified by Idade d'Ouro do Brazil, quickly spreading to the nearby captaincies and generating fear amongst the revolutionaries.

The Provisory Government of Parnaíba was led by Francisco José da Silveira, Francisco Xavier Monteiro da Franca, Inácio Leopoldo de Albuquerque Maranhão and Antônio Pereira de Albuquerque. it took several economic measures, including the abolition of several taxes, the monopoly of Brazilwood, equalizing the customs rights for all nations and cutting the export taxes over cottom in 50%. The Government also abolished the bicameral system, what was criticized by João Ribeiro.

José Martiniano Pereira de Alencar and Miguel Joaquim César were responsible for gatering support for their cause in Ceará. The Provisional Government of Parnaíba has also sent David Leopoldo Targini to the captaincy. The three of them possibly met at the house of father José Ferreira Nobre and later they looked for support from father Luiz José Corrêa de Sá. There was sympathy of the population towards the revolutionaries, specially on the countryside, but Governor Manuel Inácio de Sampaio kept control of the Capital and tried to seduce soldiers with promotions.

The Revolt was notified by Hipólito José da Costa in Correio Braziliense. The coverage began in April 1817. Initially, the newspaper had published several documents and opinions in favor of the revolution. In the next months, Hipólito changed his initial position and criticized their leadership, calling them "unprepared", their choice for a republican government, and the imposition of their reforms through "unfair means", besides avoiding the use of the term "revolution". In August, after the suffocation of the revolution, Hipólito called it "criminal and imprudent". The sudden change of the coverage was partly due a dispute with the Venezuelan periodical Correo del Orinoco.

The journal wrongly stated the states of Maranhão, Itamaracá and Pará also joined the republicans, and most of the coverage happened after the end of the Revolt.

=== Court's reaction ===
The royalists were afraid of the influence the Pernambucan revolt could have on Brazil, that could lead for the complete independence of South America, and thus began an intense vigil of the Brazilian coast, to avoid support from the Spanish America and the United States. A letter directed to Juan Martín de Pueyrredón and intercepted by the British consul Henry Chamberlain revealed the involvement of the masonry in the revolt to the court, and their intentions of spreading the revolution to other captaincies.

==== Ceará, Parnaíba and Rio Grande do Norte ====
In Ceará, the revolt reached Crato on 3 May, led by Alencar. On 13 March, a revolutionary troop coming from Itabaiana invaded the Chamber of Councilors of Vila do Pilar, broke the monarchic symbols and took tissues to be used as shotgun bushing.

There were also plans to attack Icó. The first mention of an attack on the city was from 17 April. Miguel Joaquim César de Melo had instructions to raise animosity in Icó through letters and proclamations, but those did not have the desired effect, as the city was populated by conservative Portuguese merchants. After the insurrection in Crato, the city hall emitted an acclamation in favor of Dom João VI. Afterwards, the liberal emissaries in Ceará planned an armed takeover of the city by three troops: One made by Crato insurgents led by Alencar and José Pereira Filgueiras coming from São João do Rio do Peixe, one made by men of the villages of Souza and Pombal led by Miguel and Francisco Antônio Corrêa de Sá and another made by men of Portalegre led by David Leopoldo Targini. According to Governor Sampaio, Miguel raised an army of 700 to 800 men, including José de Sá Cavalcante, Antônio Ferreira de Souza and Manuel Ferreira de Souza. Miguel Carlos da Silva Saldanha has also participated in trying to raise funds for Domingos da Mota Teixeira gather troops. Despite that, the attack never happened.

The Provisional Government of Rio Grande do Norte fell on 25 April, when monarchists left from Manuel da Costa Bandeira's house and invaded the government building. The leader of the government, André de Albuquerque Maranhão, was hurt on his crotch and imprisoned at Fortaleza dos Santos Reis. He died on the next day due to his wounds. On 10 May Targini created another Provisional Government in Portalegre. He had support of 20 armed men and Miguel that, after the fall of the revolution in Parnaíba, he feared being arrested by father Luís José and his son Francisco Sá and fled with his troops to Portalegre. The father's loyalty to the cause was already considered dubious after he failed to arrest André Alves Pereira Ribeiro e Cirne. The government was composed by João Barbosa Cordeiro, Leandro Francisco de Beça, José Francisco Vieira de Barros, Manuel Joaquim Palácio and Felipe Bandeira de Moura.

On 11 May, Crato was taken by major captain Filgueiras and Leandro Bezerra Monteiro at about 1 pm. The leaders of the revolution in the city were arrested and transported to Icó on the 16th and to Fortaleza on the 19th, by orders of Joaquim de Pinto Madeira. On the 14th, Luiz José reconquered Souza and on the next day Pombal.

On 18 May, Ribeiro e Cirne joined forces with Francisco Sá to attack Portalegre and Vila do Príncipe. The Governor of Ceará also dispatched an army of 1600 to 1800 men and troop of indigenous archers, led by colonel Alexandre José Leite de Chaves e Melo, that were approaching the cities. The Provisional Government of Rio Grande do Norte is then dissolved on the 19th and Andrade, Cordeiro and Targini fled.

==== Pernambuco ====
After the arrest of Father Roma in Bahia, Marcos Noronha de Brito made arrangements to fight the insurgents. He sent two merchant ships, Mercúrio and Carrasco, to start the maritime blockage of Pernambuco. He also sent an expedition of 800 men, but some versions state that he sent 5 thousand men. He sent a battalion of hunters led by Major D. Luiz Balthazar da Silveira, that joined two cavalry commands led by Francisco de Paula e Oliveira. On 6 April he sent 60 artillery men commanded by Captain Francisco de Paula de Miranda Chaves and later the 1º. Infantry Regiment, commanded by Major Rodrigo de Argolo Vargas Cirne de Menezes. All the troops were commanded by Marshal Joaquim de Melo leite Cogominho de Lacerda and his assistants, Majors José Egydio Gordilho de Barbuda and Salvador José Maciel. Besides the armed repression, his troops also sent declarations signed by him demanding obedience from the three Captaincies to the Royal Crown.

The Republican Army was made with several sectors of society. 300 Black men were recruited to the regiment Terço Velho dos Henriques, a homage to Henrique Dias. Several other troops were anexated during the campaign against the royalty, and as the time of their defeat, the Revolutionary Army was mostly made out of farmers, engenho workers, Alagoan Indians and a pardo company from Penedo. Father Antônio Souto Maior organized troops nicknamed as Holy Battalion.

Some notorious people that joined the war effords were Frei Caneca, that joined the troops on Engenho Velho, Francisco Pais Barreto, member of Dias Martins militias since 6 March, and his relatives Tomás Lins Caldas and Francisco da Rocha Pais Barreto, members of the Holy Battalion.

Father Dias Martins was named General by the government. Colonel Suassuna, despite being considered suspicious by Domingos José Martins for his sympathy with the Fluminense Freemasons, was sent by Antônio Carlos to the south of Pernambuco as Commander of a section of the Dias Martins troops to stop the advancement of the royal troops from Bahia.

Alagoas showed resistance since the very beginning and created guerrillas on mata sul. The engenho Utinga, located in Utinga, owned by José Alves de Castro, became grounds of royalist fanatics, according to the description of Muniz Tavares. The royalists were using a rosary flag, instead of the symbols of the Portuguese monarchy. Suassuna marched from Candeias to the north of Jangadas and met the troops of Father Antônio. Together, they attacked the engenho in a battle that lasted for about five hours. During the conflict, a royalist carrying a saint on his right arm and a drawknife on his left arm jumped in front of the rebel troops, thinking that his holy symbols would protect him, but he was shot dead during the battle. The rebel troops suffered some losses, but the battle was won by Suassuna. He then ordered the engenho to be burnt down and retreated back to Candeias.

After the defeat, the royalists changed their strategy and proceeded to isolate the South of Recife. Suassuna knew that the royalist army was marching North from Tamandaré and wanted to fortify his troops on engenho Guarapu or Trapiche, but another troop was sent to the south of Pernambuco, this time under the command of Domingos José Martins. Suassuna tried to negotiate with General Congominho, reassuring the support of the constitutionalist Freemasons to Dom João VI cause, but Martins wanted to attack Congominho's troops immediately. As neither of them could come to an agreement, they decided to keep the troops independent from each other.

The revolutionaries were forced to retreat to Candeias, as they thought the Bahia Army was around the Persinunga River. But the Army advanced without suffering any kind of resistance, and was already in Sirinhaém. In May 1817, when the guerrillas raised their intensity, few men wanted to fight the counter-revolutionaries. Amongst them were Luiz José Lins Caldas and his two sons, Tomás Lins Caldas and Francisco da Rocha Pais Barreto.

The Revolutionary Army was defeated on 15 May in Merepe and Ipojuca, on the so-called Battle of Pindoba or Ipojuca. Martins' forces were defeated after crossing Mererepe River. Suassuna's troops were surprised by the royalists on engenho Pindoba and were defeated. The enemy troops were fortified with cavalry from Sergipe and militias from Alagoas. Martins' troops tried to retreat but they were hunted down on the swamps of Porto de Galinhas. Martins, Father Antônio, Tomás Lins Caldas and Francisco da Rocha Pais Barreto tried to hide in a local house, but according to "Um episódio da históriada Revolução de 1817, na Província de Pernambuco, passado entre os presos d'Estado na cadeia da Bahia", written by an anonymous prisoner, they were discovered and sent as prisoners to Rodrigo Lobo, together with many other soldiers.

=== Fall ===
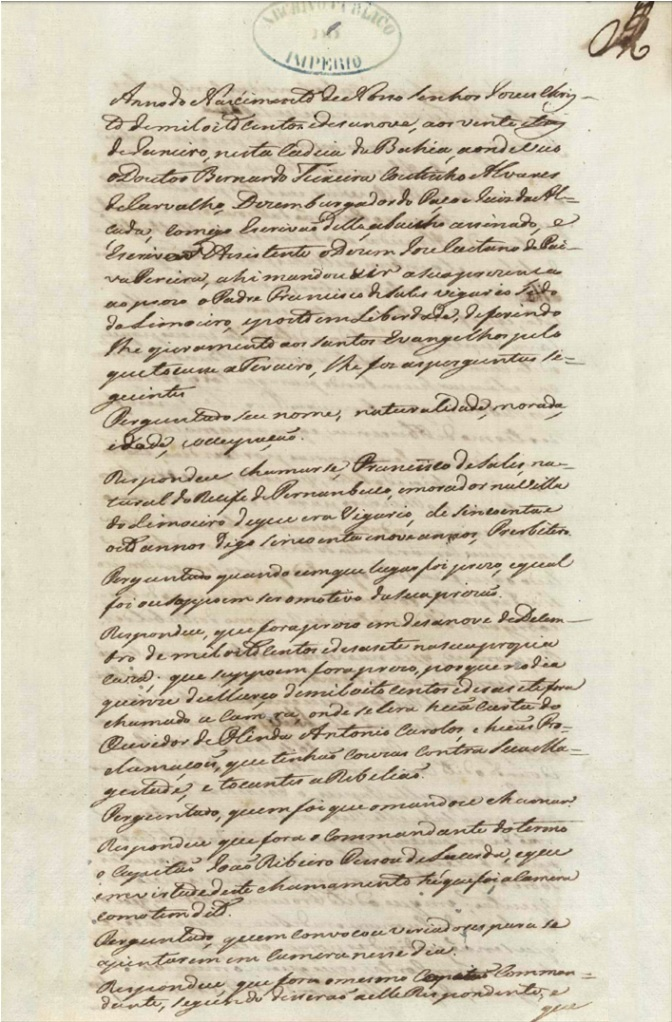
Page of the trial process of the leaders of the Pernambuco Revolution, 1819. National Archives of Brazil.

Two months later Recife was surrounded by sea and land by troops of the Portuguese monarch. The revolution, soon after, was dismantled. Marcos de Noronha Brito lead four attacks against Recife. The commander of the maritime blockage was Rodrigo José Ferreira.

The revolt lasted for 74 days, ending on 15 April 1817. Moments before the imminent failure, several of the leaders renounced their positions, but according to the crown João Ribeiro stood until the very end, committing suicide when Recife fell.

Before the fall of the movement, the revolutionaries sought out the support of the United States, Argentina and England, without success. Known casualties of the conflict include the eventual execution of the rebel leaders: Domingos José Martins, José Luis de Mendonça, Domingos Teotônio Jorge and the Catholic priests Miguelinho and Pedro de Sousa Tenório. The corpses of the condemned were later mutilated by having their hands and heads cut off. Other corpses were dragged by their heads to a burial ground.

Marcos Noronha de Brito troops were very violent, being responsible for the killing of several prisoners by shooting or hanging. He also made several deportations to Lisbon and created on 20 March the Military Commissions, a governmental organ responsible for dictating the execution of the prisoners, many times without a proper judgement. His troops left Pernambuco on 26 May.

Over 100 Pernambucans and 70 Paraibans were transferred to Aljube prison, where they stayed for months due the slow process of the judicial system. Several of them were not benefited by the indulgement, as they were not even declared culprits, and many died in prison. Francisco Pais Barreto was one of the first to be arrested, being dragged to Bahia inside of Carrasco. Damilo Alves and Bento de Lemos allowed themselves to be arrested. The 71 prisoners carried by the ship were later known as the "71 of Carrasco". João Pais Barreto and other 41 prisoners, including Francisco do Rego Barros and Trapiche do Cabo, were transported inside Inriga.

Inside of the jail, it was decided by the government the prisoners should be split into classes as a way to receive their rations. The prisoners decided to split into three classes: Majors, omnibudsmen and other important classes; militaries, clergymen and analphabets with some sort of public job; and finally anyone who could not fit in the first two classes. Tomás Lins Caldas and Francisco da Rocha Pais Barreto were both promoted to Majors to avoid falling in the third class.

Domingos José Martins, José Luiz de Mendonça and Father Miguel Joaquim de Castro e Almeida were shot dead on 12 July on Campo da Pólvora.

On 15 September 1817, Tomás Antônio Vila Nova Portugal revoked the license of James Pinches' press.

After the revolt, the crown redefined the word "patriot", becoming a synonym of "rebel", and a crime of high treason. During the trials against the rebels, several of them were arrested and some executed under the accusation of being patriots.

== Diplomatic relations ==
=== United States ===
==== American support ====
On 3 March, President James Madison signed the Neutrality Law of 1817, declaring neutrality over the Spanish American wars of independence. The official Diplomat of the United Kingdom of Portugal, Brazil and the Algarves, José Correia da Serra, was personal friends of James Madison, John Quincy Adams and Thomas Jefferson and supported the creation of the Law, to avoid turmoil on Brazilian soil. At a time, Brazil was also seen by investors, such as Henry Hill, as a promising new market after the end of the War of 1812, and Correia da Serra was sought for investments on machinery and other products. Many of those merchants, including the future President John Quincy Adams, were eager to end the dependency of Brazil to the Portuguese Crown to expand their businesses. Despite that, the American-Portuguese relations grew, and Rio de Janeiro was the only South American city to have an embassy from the United States. Yet another important factor was the location of Pernambuco, that, differently from other South American countries, it was located in the middle of the Portuguese kingdom, making it hard for American supporters to send help.

News about the revolt reached the US through Charles Bowen, that left Recife on 13 March. He disembarked on the Port of Norfolk and gave the news to the Norfolk Herald. The journal notified the arrival of the diplomat and soon other journals published about the revolt, including the Washington-based National Intelligencer, Georgetown Messenger, The Philadelphia Aurora, Niles Weekly Register and Baltimore Patriot, that published "Preciso" in English. The journals were overall favorable for the republican cause. Despite that, some outlets, such as Georgetown Messenger, expected the revolt not to last much. Two other American sailors, Seebohn and one unknown, were supporters of the Revolution and spread the news in US soil, creating certain sympathy within Americans. Bowen then met the Governor and spoke about the revolution. Correia da Serra thus left to Washington D.C. on 31 May to speak against Bowen's audience, but it was considered legit. A letter from Manoel de Arruda Câmara to his American friend "N" hints some sort of collaboration amongst the two nations.

Antonio Gonçalves da Cruz, known as Cruz Cabugá, was nominated Diplomat in the United States and, together with Domingos Pires Ferreira, that served as a translator, left Recife on 6 April. They brought 60:000$000 to buy ammunition and hiring mercenaries. Cabugá was instructed as not to create fights against Correia da Serra, as he was well regarded in American soil.

Cruz Cabugá reached Boston on 15 May, with journals such as Boston Daily Advertiser and Philadelphia Aurora praising his arrival. There, he bought ammunition and sent it to Pernambuco. Disappointed for not being able to talk with important political figures, Cabugá went to Philadelphia. On 4 June, the President sent Caesar Augustus Rodney, member of a commission for South American matters, and Willian Jones, President of the Federal Reserve, to Philadelphia to speak with Cabugá in private. The conversation happened on 6 June, where it was explained there was little the president could do for several reasons, including that the recognition of Pernambuco was an attribution of the American Congress. Cabugá, then, explained he wasn't looking for recognition of Pernambuco, as probably it would create hostilities with the United Kingdom. As a consequence of the meeting, bilateral agreements were made, where, even though the US did not recognized Pernambuco, merchant ships using the revolt's flag were allowed to enter in the US, that the US would not consent to a blockage of the Pernambucan ports, Pernambuco was allowed to buy American ammunition and Cabugá would not be recognized as an emissary from Pernambuco due the US's involvement with European countries.

Two days later, Cabugá received permission to meet Richard Rush. He went to New York City and then to Washington, D.C.. During his travel, Cabugá went to Port of Baltimore, Maryland, where he bought ammunition and, together with the ones he bought in Boston, sent to Pernambuco within two ships. He bought 300 pistols, 300 sabers for light cavalry, 1,000 light hunting shotguns, 2,000 light shotguns similar to the ones used by the French Army, 200 pistols for the cavalry, 2,000 light hunting pistols, and 7,000 infantry shotguns. According to Correia da Serra, the ships were named Hoop Packet and Pinguim. Due the failure of Correia da Serra to stop Cabugá's actions, he advised Dom João VI to maintain vigilance over American ships to stop the ammunition to reach Brazil. Nonetheless, the ships arrived after the end of the Revolution. According to sailors intercepted by the Portuguese government, Pinguim headed to Gibraltar, but sank. The Portuguese authorities suspected the sailors were lying and arrested them, and thus heard about the plans to free Napoleon. Later, it was discovered the information was indeed a lie. The ship Sally Dana was also sent with supplies. It was supposedly commissioned by the American Consul Joseph Ray.

The meeting with Rush happened on 14 June. He sent documents addressed to the President about the revolution. The meeting was the first encounter of a Brazilian diplomat with a Minister of Foreign Affairs. There, he was spied by the monarchists and suffered heavy resistance from Correia da Serra, that accused the American Government from spreading revolutions for not doing anything against Cabugá. Cabugá's pledges were not heard by Joseph Ray and Thomas Jefferson showed interest in signing a trade deal with Brazil, sending the ship Brackenridge in a diplomatic mission.

On 20 August, the revolt showed clear signs of decline, and Cruz Cabugá appealed for the President to send help for the rebels to avoid bloodshed.

After the failure of the revolt, Cruz Cabugá stayed on the United States, and on 21 May 1818, he was part of a dinner with other South-American rebels on Pennsylvania, where they proclaimed revenge against the martyrs of Pernambuco. It was the first anniversary of the revolt, and several American supporters, including Governor of Pennsylvania Charles Jared Ingersoll, were present.

==== Napoleonic plans ====
Argentine historian Emilio Ocampo investigated the life of Carlos María de Alvear, and found British documents about a Bonapartist plot in Pernambuco to free Napoleon Bonaparte, and take him to some strategic location in South America, in order to create a new Napoleonic Empire. Alvear's plans were never carried out because of the defeat of the revolution.

Cruz Cabugá was also sent to United States to contact Joseph Bonaparte and try to hire French soldires for the Pernambucan cause. Joseph and his allies fled to the US in search of a job, as they declined to swear allignance to Louis XVIII. Joseph then proposed the republicans to help in freeing Napoleon from the Island of Saint Helena using Fernando de Noronha as an escape route to New Orleans. Despite the initial Portuguese resentment towards Napoleon for the transfer of the Portuguese court to Brazil, the anti-Braganca sentiment was such that many involved with the revolt supposedly supported the conspiracy to release the French monarch.

The ship Paragon left the US for an unknown destination, and raised Correia da Costa's suspicion as it was carrying Colonel Latapie, Louis-Adolphe Le Doulcet, Artong and Raulet, all of which had ties with Napoleon. According to Ferreira da Costa, Colonel Latapie told him that they went to Brazil to inform José Bonaparte about the revolution to cary on the plans to free Napoleon, but on the date of the emissary's arrival, the Pernambuco revolutionaries were already besieged by Portuguese monarchist troops and close to surrender. Le Doulcet stayed on Baía Formosa, Rio Grande do Norte, where José Inácio Borges found him a job as a doctor and botanist, and Latapie, Artong and Raulet carried on to Paraíba.

Napoleon's veterans were arrested in Paraíba by the Governor Tomás de Sousa Mafra and later sent to Recife, where they were interrogated by the Governor Luís do Rego. All of them said that allegedly were looking for a job, and Rego freed them, but sent spies to follow their steps. Le Doulcet came from Rio Grande do Norte and joined his companions, and they were found guilty as all of them were attending Joseph Ray's house, the American Consul, as since his arrival in Brazil he was accused of hiding rebels in his house. Rego ordered their arrest, and during the police operation, the secretary Jorge Fleming Holdt, three men and a mulatta woman and her baby were also arrested. They confessed their real intentions in Brazil, with Latapie being the one who talked the most. Dom João asked for the deposition of Joseph Ray, and his wishes were granted by the American President Quincy Adams.

=== Mozambique ===
On 10 March, the republicans send a letter through the American ship Sally Dana for the Governor of Mozambique José Francisco de Paula Cavalcante de Albuquerque. He was a Freemason known for trying to approach Grand Orient de France and Grand Orient of Portugal. The royalists speculated the rebels wanted to bring him to Pernambuco. The letter was never answered and it is not known if it arrived to the recipient.

=== Viceroyalty of the Río de la Plata ===
The revolt was notified in journals from the Viceroyalty of the Río de la Plata, such as O Censor and a Gazeta de Buenos-Ayres. Juan Martín de Pueyrredón was aware of the revolution and was receiving news through letters.

Correio Braziliense reported that Felix José Tavares Lira was named a Diplomat for the Viceroyalty of the Río de la Plata. He was supposedly sent to Buenos Aires to negotiate with the rebels in Paraguay. The journal would later retract, saying it was a mistake, but several historians considered the information real.

Pedro de Souza Tenório was asked to be the Diplomat in the region but he declined.

=== Kingdom of Great Britain ===
According to Maria Graham, the rebels were eager to know if Great Britain would support their independence. Despite that, the British Crown supported the Portuguese Crown, and Lord Castlereagh expressed relief for the reduced influence the revolt had.

Hipólito José da Costa was asked to be the Diplomat in London, but he refused.

== Ideals ==
The conspiracy was inspired by the French Revolution and the American Revolution. It sought to cut ties from the monarchy and establish a republic controlled by the local elites. One big influence for the revolt ideals was Condorcet. His philosophy, known as physiocracy, supported a system where civil rights were given to all, but not political rights. Instead, politics would be controlled by the land owners. Those ideas also impacted the position of the Government over slavery. According to the Government, they deemed every men equal and they yearned for a slow transition towards abolitionism, but property was the base of society and should be respected. One example of the treatment of the government towards slaves was Maria da Conceição. During the beginning of the revolt, she thought she was going to be freed and talked badly against a white woman. As consequence, she was sentenced to receive 72 blows with a ferule.

There was a great patriotic sentiment, but not as a Brazilian people. Instead, a "patriot" was someone born within the revolting states.

The involved parties considered the revolution to be the second restoration of Pernambuco, as the first was the expulsion of the Dutch in 1654. There was a strong nationalistic sentiment amongst them, besides an antagonism against the Portuguese. During the revolt, several people asked the juntas to change their names with heroes from 1654. For example, on 25 March 1817, the junta from Parnaíba added "Vieira" to Amaro Gomes Coutinho surname as a homage to João Fernandes Vieira.

Shortly after the establishment of the Provincial Government of the Republic, all the monarchic symbols were abolished and a new calendar was established, with the starting point at the beginning of the revolution. There were also plans to establish a flag and Constitution similar to the United States and a new Constitution based on the United States Bill of Rights, where Brazil would be transformed into a federation. Together with the new flag, they used a white and blue lace as symbol and created new ceremonies. During the blessing ceremony after the election, zabumbas were played and arms were shot while the leaders kneeled and swore with their right hands raised to defend the new nation.

In the peak of the revolt, one finds that the strongest Pernambucan patriots marked their identity in several methods – including drinking aguardente instead of wine and host made of wheat. The use of the pronoun "vós" was incentivised, as the old "vossa mercê" denoted a division of social classes.

Further patriotic feelings were expressed with the chants:

Quando a voz da pátria chama
tudo deve obedecer;
Por ela a morte é suave
Por ela cumpre morrer

When the voice of the fatherland calls
All must obey
For her death is gentle
For she is worth dying for

=== Flag of the Revolt ===
The original flag, with three stars representing Pernambuco, Paraíba and Rio Grande do Norte.

The current flag of the Brazilian state, adopted from the revolt.

The general layout of the flag used by the revolutionaries still endures today, as the flag of the Brazilian state of Pernambuco. The first flag was formed from the requirement for a flag to replace the Portuguese flag that had been hauled down from the Recife fort after the provisional government took control of the city. The government originally considered hoisting the French tricolor, but instead appointed a committee under the chairmanship of Father João Ribeiro Pessoa to develop a design. The design was copied in watercolor by the Rio de Janeiro artist Antônio Álvares—a painting that still existed when Ribeiro was writing in the 1930s—essentially the same as the modern state flag with the field dark blue over white, a single star above the rainbow. The flags were produced by the tailor José Barbosa, who was also a captain in the militia. The first flag was publicly blessed by the dean of the Recife cathedral on 21 March 1817. The flag was created by Antônio Alves and confeccionated by the mulattos José do Ó Barbosa and Francisco Dornelas Pessoa.

In 1917, the same flag became the official banner of the current state.

According to its physical description, the flag's features signify the following: "The blue color in the upper rectangle symbolizes the grandeur of the Pernambuco sky. The color the white area is for peace. The three-colored rainbow represents the union of all the people of Pernambuco. The star indicates the state within the grouping of the Federation. The sun is the force and energy of Pernambuco, and finally, the cross represents our faith in justice and mutual understanding."

== See also ==
- Rebellions and revolutions in Brazil
- History of Brazil
- Northeastern Brazil
- Pernambuco
- Frei Caneca
- Politics of Pernambuco
