= Domingos José Martins =

Brazilian merchant and revolutionary (1781–1817)

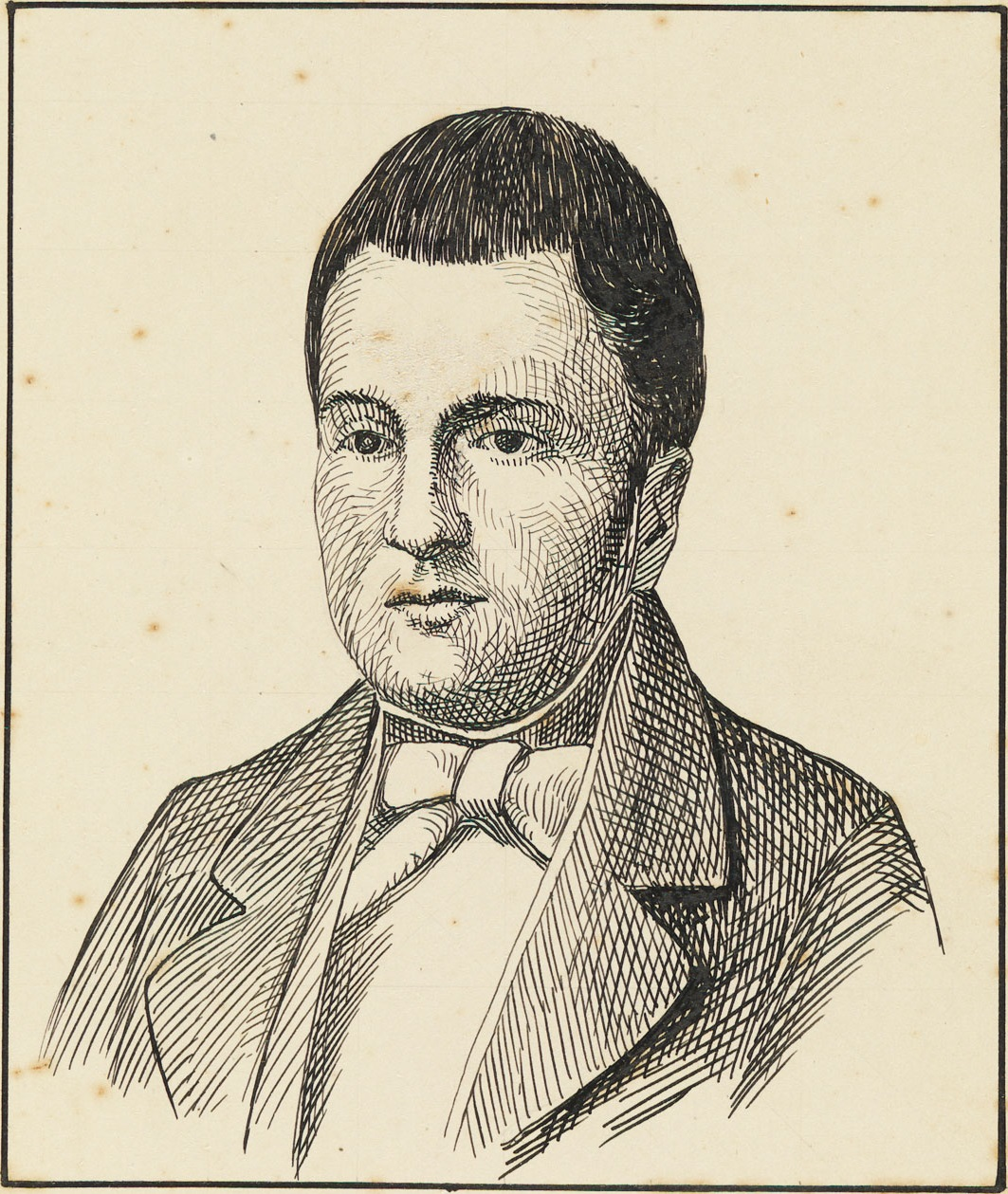

Leader of the Provisional Government of the Republic
- In office 16 March 1817 – 15 April 1817 Serving with João Ribeiro Pessoa de Melo Montenegro, Domingos Teotônio Jorge Martins Pessoa, José Luís de Mendonça and Manoel Correia de Araújo

Personal details
- Born: 9 May 1781 Fazenda Caxangá, Itapemirim
- Died: 12 July 1817 (aged 36) Campo da Pólvora, Recife
- Cause of death: Execution by firing squad
- Spouse: Maria Teodora da Costa
- Parents: Joaquim José Martins (father); Joana Luiza de Santa Clara Martins (mother)
- Occupation: Merchant

Domingos José Martins (9 May 1781 – 12 July 1817) was a Brazilian merchant and revolutionary.

Member of the Freemasonry of the English tradition, he was important for the reestablishment of the Freemasons in the Captaincy of Pernambuco during the 1810s. He was one of the leaders of the Pernambucan Revolt, being arrested on 15 April 1817 after the Battle of Ipojuca and was later executed on Campo da Pólvora.

Despite his important role on the Revolt, several details of his life are unknown or contested. Nevertheless, he became an important historical figure in Espírito Santo after the Proclamation of the Republic, and in 2011 his name was added on the Book of Heroes of the Homeland by the president Dilma Rousseff.

== Early life ==
Martins was born on 9 May 1781 on Fazenda Caxangá, Itapemirim, where today Marataízes is located. He was the son of the militia captain Joaquim José Martins and Joana Luiza de Santa Clara Martins, and had seven siblings. Despite that, his birth place is contested by some.

According to Joaquim Dias Martins, Domingos left his homeplace during his youth trying to build himself a fortune in the Captaincy of Bahia. He supposedly gave up for not agreeing with the difficulties imposed for new merchants and the generalized slavery, and moved to Lisbon. There, he found similar problems he suffered in Brazil and decided to move to London, where he worked as finance director of the Portuguese company Dourado, Dias e Carvalho. There, he was initiated in the Freemasonry of the English tradition.

In the first trimester of 1812 Martins was already back in Brazil. He was officially fiscalizing the branches of his company, but according to Francisco Muniz Tavares he was sent by the Freemasons to watch the progress of the revolutionary movements in Brazil. According to Joaquim, Domingos became acquainted with Francisco de Miranda, an important figure for the independence of Venezuela, and he offered his help to introduce the ideals of the independence of the United States in Brazil. According to the merchant Louis-François Tollenare, his company had gone bankrupt. He first went with Domingos Teotônio Jorge to the Captancies of Ceará and Bahia, where he was introduced to the Grande Oriente do Brasil. According to Tollenare, Domingos made some money by investing in cotton during his permanence in the Captaincy. Domingos then returned to London in 1815.

He established himself in Recife at some point and became a prohiminent public figure. According to Tollenare he tried to become a merchant and failed, becoming a farmer instead. Both of them had a fight when Tollenare refused to allow the use of his ship, Felicité, to transport flour from the United States for him. He also joined two of the main masonic lodges of Pernambuco, the Academies of Cabo and Paraíso.

== Pernambucan revolt ==
In 1817, Martins and João Ribeiro ended relationships with the Tennant Colonel Alexandre Tomás, which followed the Masonry of French tradition. Because of this, Governor Caetano Pinto reported a possible conspiracy against the Portuguese and announced the arrest of several people, including José de Barros Lima. During his arrest, Lima killed the Brigadier Manoel Joaquim Barbosa de Castro and gained support from the fellow Officers, thus starting the Pernambucan revolt. He was elected as one of the five leaders of the revolt, representing the commercial class.

Martins was sent with troops to help Colonel Suassuna fight the royalists. They knew General Congominho was advancing from Tamandaré to surround the South of Pernambuco, but Martins wanted to do a frontal attack, while Suassuna wanted to fortify their troops on engenho Guarapu or Trapiche. As they couldn't come to an agreement, both troops were kept independent from each other. On 15 April, the troops of Marcos de Noronha Brito attacked Martins' troops after he crossed the Mererepe River, in the so-called Battle of Pindoba or Ipojuca. Martins was wounded and his troops tried to retreat but they were hunted down on the swamps of Porto de Galinhas. Martins, Father Antônio, Tomás Lins Caldas and Francisco da Rocha Pais Barreto had hidden in several local houses, but they were denounced by a native Brazililan and sent as prisoners to Rodrigo Lobo.

Domingos was later sent to Aljube prison. He was taken to Lisbon inside of the ship Carrasco. During his departure, he briefly talked to the appointed Governor Luís do Rego. According to the Historical and Geographical Institute of Espírito Santo, he wrote the poem Soneto do Patriota while in prison. On 12 July, he was shot dead together with José Luiz de Mendonça and Father Miguel Joaquim de Castro e Almeida on Campo da Pólvora.

== Personal life ==
He married Maria Teodora da Costa shortly before his execution, daughter of the slave-trader Bento José da Costa.

== Historiography ==
=== Primary sources ===
Most of Martins' documented life was registered by his peers from the Pernambucan Revolt.

Some of the main primary sources are the travel diary of the merchant Louis-François de Tollenare, published with the name Notas Dominicaes, the reports of the traveller Ferdinand Denis and the revolucionary Gervásio Pires Ferreira. Tollenare was not fond of Domingos and had portraited him as mediocre but a good speaker. He also stated that Domingos was the main articulator of the Revolt and used others to become the leader of the new State. Dennis and Gervásio also declared that Domingos was a bad merchant. Luís do Rego would talk to him after his arrest, describing him as very interesting, young and good-looking.

Francisco Muniz Tavares was part of the Revolt and as result, was arrested. He wrote his book História da Revolução de Pernambuco em 1817 (1840) during his term as president of the Archeological, Historic and Geographic Institute of Pernambuco. Despite his good views of the Revolt, he made effords to be neutral in regard of the occurring facts. In his book, Domingos is seem in good terms, but Tavares states that he wasn't a good merchant.

The priest Joaquim Dias Martins wrote about Domingos in his book Os Mártires Pernambucanos Victimas da Lyberdade nas Duas Revoluções Ensaiadas em 1710 e 1817 (1853). He didn't personally meet Domingos, but he had collected several spoken statements from participants of the Revolt. On his book, Martins is portraited as a republican hero.

=== Disputed narratives ===
Several details from Domingo's life are contested. Part of his historiography was influenced by the Monteiro family, that dominated Espírito Santo's politics during the First Brazilian Republic. The state's historiography tends to highlight him as a national and local hero.

The precise location of his birth is contested. For example, Cleto Nunes and Muniz Freire affirm Martins was born in Vitória. On the other hand, Affonso Claudio and João Ribeiro stated that Martins was born in the Captaincy of Bahia. The primary source Tollenare also affirmed the same. Others, such as Pierre Larousse, stated that Martins was born in Portugal. Trying to solve the matter once for all, on the book Domingos Martins e a Revolução Pernambucana de 1817 (1974), Norbertino Bahiense affirmed that he met a man named Antônio Martins that attested Domingos was born at Marataízes, the current accepted version of his birth.

Martins is one of the responsibles for reactivating the freemasonry in the Captaincy of Pernambuco in 1813. His model of freemasonry was known for being predominantetly Brazilian, and had great influence in the captaincy. He is commonly appointed as leader of the Freemason lodges in Brazil, but according to the historian Breno Andrade, there are no documents that point to the claims, and it is possible that his role was exaggerated.

Pierre Larousse affirmed that he was a lawyer and fought the Spanish and João Ribeiro affirmed he moved to Pernambuco only in 1914, after concluding his studies in Europe.

== Cultural impact ==
=== Homages ===
Domingos José Martins became a proiminent historical figure in Espírito Santo. One important factor on his historicity is that much that is known was divulgated by the Historical and Geographical Institute of Espírito Santo (IHGES). He was probably chosen as a Capixaba hero because most of the IHGES original members were Freemasons, nationalists and republicans. His historical figure is so prohiminent inside of the institute that he is often praised on the regular meetings and the inauguration speeches of the new directors. According to the historians Rafael Cerqueira do Nascimento and José Pontes Schayder, the state of Espírito Santo was born on the myth that it was persecuted by the government, and sought to recover itself from the social delay imposed into him. The institute sought to create historical figures that represented that feeling. Domingos was someone that was born on the state and was a crucial part of a historical event that shook the country, thus considered a perfect fit for a local hero.

The IHGES was inaugurated on 12 June 1916, exactly 99 years after the death of Martins. On the following year, the Revista do Instituto Histórico e Geographico do Espírito Santo, the institute's first publication, called him a "martyr of the republic", his poems and caricature were published and the celebration of his birth and death were announced. There should happen the inauguration of a sculpture of his bust on the centenary of his death, made by the professor of the Escola Nacional de Belas Artes José Otavio Correia Lima, but it wasn't finalized on time. The sculpture was inaugurated on Praça João Clímaco, Vitória, in 1922.

On 30 December 1921, the municipality of Campinho was renamed to Domingos Martins through the Law no. 1,307, authorship of Nestor Gomes. His homages happens every 12 June in front of his bust since 1978, when the capital of Espírito Santo was transferred.

On 1 May 1945, the first edition of Folha Capixaba, edited by the Brazilian Communist Party (PCB), made a homage to Martins.

On 15 December 1969, Itapemirim created the holiday of Domingos José Martins through the Law nº 561, signed by the mayor Thomé de Souza Machado.

On 12 June 1981, Domingos Martins became the patron of the Civil Police of Espírito Santo.

On 15 September 2011, Dilma Rousseff included Domingos Martins name on the Book of Heroes of the Homeland.

There is a street called Domingos José Martins on Bom Jesus e da Guia neighborhood, Recife.

=== Media ===
- Heroes and Heroines of the Independency (2017)

== Bibliography ==
- Bigossi, Bruna Breda (2018). "Domingos José Martins: A invenção de um herói para os capixabas no Instituto Histórico e Geográfico do Espírito Santo". Post-Graduation in History (in Brazilian Portuguese). Federal University of Espírito Santo.
- Tavares, Francisco Muniz (2017). História da Revolução de Pernambuco em 1817 (in Brazilian Portuguese) (5 ed.). CEPE Editora. ISBN 978-85-7858-464-1.
