= Officina Typographica da República de Pernambuco 2ª Vez Restaurada =

Officina Typographica da 2ª Restauração de Pernambuco (Typography Office of the 2nd Restauration of Pernambuco), later renamed as Officina Typographica da República de Pernambuco 2ª Vez Restaurada (Typography Office of the Republic of Pernambuco 2nd Time Resored), was the first fully operational publishing house of Pernambuco, established on 28 March 1817 by James Pinches in Recife. It published declarations and manifestos in favour of the Provisional Government of the Republic during the Pernambucan revolution. It ceased operations on 15 September, when the Crown revoked its license. Governor Luís do Rego used parts of their belongings to create the publishing house Oficina do Trem de Pernambuco on 16 March 1821.

== History ==
In 1817, the architects of the Pernambucan revolution wanted to use a typographic machine to print governmental acts and administrative documents and declarations to make the population aware of their objectives. On 9 March, they bought one from the English James Pinches, who acquired it from Europe in the previous year for reselling, but it was forgotten in a warehouse due to the lack of interest. Another version states that the typographic machine was bought by the merchant Ricardo Rodrigues Catanho in 1815. He obtained permission from the Crown to start operating, but it was never used due to the lack of qualified personnel.

Thus, on 28 March 1817 Officina Typographica da 2ª Restauração de Pernambuco was officially created. It was the first fully operational typography of Pernambuco. As no one could operate the machinery, James Pinches was asked to run the project. He worked as a typographer together with a French sailor. A few days later, Pinshes was substituted by Joaquim Bernardo Froés. The name was later changed to Officina Typographica da República de Pernambuco 2ª Vez Restaurada as asked by Father João Ribeiro.

On 15 September, after the revolution was crushed, the new governor of Pernambuco Luís do Rego, 1st Viscount of Geraz do Lima received a letter from Tomás António de Vila Nova Portugal containing royal orders to revoke the operation license of the typography. He ordered the confiscation of their belongings on 4 November, which was fulfilled by the lieutenant colonel Raimundo José da Cunha Matos on the 8th. Rego disapproved the confiscation and delayed the transportation process. On 16 September 1818, when the General Omnibudsman of the County Antero José da Maia e Silva ordered the Typography to be put inside the ship Gavião, Rego did not follow the orders and on 6 February 1819 the Crown sent orders for it to be delivered to the Navy Quartermaster. Rego then sent only parts of the goods to Rio de Janeiro, and after the Liberal Revolution of 1820 he used what he has hidden to create the publishing house Oficina do Trem de Pernambuco on 16 March 1821.

== Publications ==
The printing was done using the paper of the previous government, that contained the royal seal, but with the royal weapons reversed.

Its first publication was printed on 28 March 1817; Preciso, written by the lawyer José Luiz de Mendonça on the 10 March. From there on, several other declarations and manifestos were published, including a pastorate of Bernardo Luís Ferreira Portugal, Denodados Patriotas Baianos and Habitantes do Ceará - Povo Brioso.
