= Caetano Pinto de Miranda Montenegro, 1st Marquis of Vila Real da Praia Grande =

Caetano Pinto de Miranda Montenegro 1st Marquis of Vila Real da Praia Grande
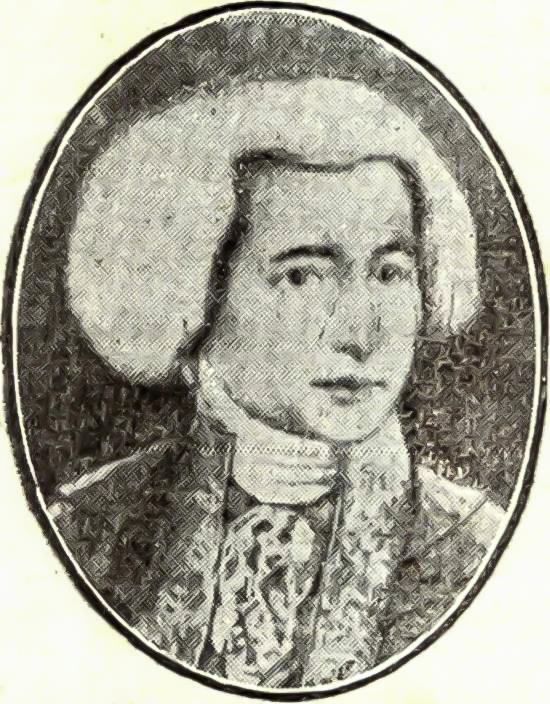
- Born: 16 September 1748; Lamego, Kingdom of Portugal
- Died: 11 January 1827 (aged 78); Rio de Janeiro, Empire of Brazil
- Spouse: Maira da Incarnação Carneiro de Figueiredo Sarmento
- Children: Caetano Pinto de Miranda Montenegro Filho; Margarida Máxima Pinto de Miranda Montenegro

32nd Captain-General of the Captaincy of Pernambuco
- In office 24 May 1804 – 7 March 1817
- Monarchs: Maria I (until 1816); John VI (from 1816)
- Governor General: Marcos de Noronha e Brito
- Preceded by: Governamental Junta of 1798
- Succeeded by: Provincial Government of the Republic

7th Captain-General of the Captaincy of Mato Grosso
- In office 6 November 1796 – 6 July 1803
- Governors General: José Luís de Castro; Fernando José de Portugal e Castro
- Preceded by: 1st Governamental Junta
- Succeeded by: 2nd Governamental Junta
- Parents: Bernardo José Pinto de Miranda Montenegro (father); Antônia Matilde Leite Pereira de Bulhões (mother)

Caetano Pinto de Miranda Montenegro, 1st Marquis of Vila Real da Praia Grande (16 September 1748 – 11 January 1827) was a Portuguese colonial administrator and nobleman, known for being the Governor-General of the Captaincies of Mato Grosso and Pernambuco. He was taken off his role on the later as a result of the Pernambucan Revolt, as he was perceived as an ally to the Portuguese Crown interests. After the independence of Brazil, he partook several roles in the government.

== First years ==
Caetano Pinto was born on 16 September 1748 in Lamego, Kingdom of Portugal. He was the second son of Bernardo José Pinto de Miranda Montenegro, fidalgo squire of the House of Braganza, with Antônia Matilde Leite Pereira de Bulhões.

He began his studies on the University of Coimbra in 1777, obtaining his Bachelor of Letters in 1781. He concluded his Licentiate and obtained his Doctorate of Law in 1783. He was contemporaneous of brothers José Bonifácio and Antônio Carlos.

== Arrival in Brazil ==
Caetano Pinto came to Rio de Janeiro in 1790. Catarina Balsemão, wife of Luís Pinto de Sousa Coutinho, asked Martinho de Melo e Castro to nominate him as Governor of Mato Grosso, but instead he was nominated as Manager of Gold from Rio de Janeiro in 1791.

== Governor of Mato Grosso ==
In 1796, he became the Governor of Mato Grosso, finishing his term in 1803.

Caetano Pinto was one of the governors that most invested in the exploration of the captaincy. He was particularly interested in finding the Quina tree (Coutarea hexandra). He hired José Manuel de Sequeira, that identified two types of quina and proceeded to find their possible locations.

During his governance, the Marquis of Pombal made several changes on Brazilian education, taking it out of the hands of the Jesuits and establishing public colleges. The professors should be chosen by a bishop, but as Mato Grosso hadn't got one, Prince Regent John gave permission to Caetano Pinto to choose them. On 14 May 1800, Caetano Pinto also made reforms on the taxes in order to better collect the "Literary Subsidy".

On 3 November 1797, he ordered the construction of the Miranda Prison near the Mboteteí River to fight the Spanish invasion in the region. The prison is considered the founding of the Miranda city. Caetano Pinto made effords to get help from the Guaicurus and Guanás to fight the Spanish, as they were being persecuted through their colonization process. He was also responsible for constructing the São José de Montenegro Prison in 1799.

== Governor of Pernambuco ==
From 1804 to 1817, Caetano Pinto was Governor of Pernambuco. He was nominated the General Captain of Angola, but was maintained in his position due protests from several municipalities, the Senate of Recife and several people close to Pedro I, and was kept in his position.

Initially, Caetano Pinto was seen as a good administrator and a reasonable and just man, that listened to both the royalty and the population. But in from 1808 on, he became known amongst the population for being weak, corrupt, a bad administrator and responsible for excessive taxes. One factor that raised animosity in Pernambuco was the loan made by Prince Regent John to restore farming in Portugal.

On 26 March 1804, Caetano Pinto intimated Lopo Joaquim de Almeida Henriques, Governor of Rio Grande do Norte, to come to Pernambuco in eight days due several crimes committed by him, including the slashing of white men in a pelourinho for not paying tribute of his watermelon plantation.

On 4 January 1808, he sent a letter to João Rodrigues de Sá e Melo regarding the transfer of the Portuguese court to Brazil, looking for instructions about the opening of the ports for friendly nations.

In 1808, Caetano Pinto tried to create a cemetery for new blacks and other people near Capela da Ordem Terceira do Carmo, possibly on the river islands on the Capibaribe and Beberibe Rivers, but his proposal was denied. In 1810, he built the British Cemetery, near Lazareto de Santo Amaro. In 1814, Caetano Pinto designated an area of 120 x 200 spans previously belonging to João Policarpo do Rêgo Barros for the British Consul, that built a cemetery.

In 1808, Caetano Pinto asked for the recruitment of a thousand Pernambucanos for the occupation of Cayenne, during the Peninsular War. Despite the protests from the population, 300 men were recruited for the military operation in 1809.

On 12 October 1808, Caetano Pinto created a bank and distributed shares that were isent of attachment and debt. According to the historian Francisco Muniz Tavares, this process lead to a raise in the cost of life in Pernambuco, as there was no gold reserve equivalent to its value.

Caetano Pinto received a report about the Pernambucan Revolt conspiracy on 1 March 1817. On 4 March, he made his troops swear obedience to the monarchy and the harmony between Brazilians and Portuguese and on the 5th he made a speech to Recife population, saying that Brazil would be elevated to a United Kingdom and all of them obeyed the same king.

On the 6th, he issued an arrest order to several Freemasons of the English rite. Amongst the accused were three artillery Captains, Domingos Teotônio Pessoa de Melo, José de Barros Lima and Pedro da Silva Pedroso. The Brigadeer Manoel Joaquim Barbosa de Castro went to Forte de São Tiago das Cinco Pontas to fulfill the order, but he was murdered by Lima. Most of the officials unleashed their swords in support of the conspirators and two Portuguese officials fled.

After a few hours, the conspirators filled the streets and Caetano Pinto and his family fled to Forte de São João Batista do Brum. He then was obligated to renounce his post as governor and fled to Rio de Janeiro.

== Activities in Rio de Janeiro ==
In 1822, he became Minister of Finance and in 1823 he became the first to occupy the role of State Secretary of Justice Business, subordinated to the Ministry of Empire and Overseas. In 1826, he became a Senator. He was also a member of the Council of state and Judge of Mesa do Desembargo do Paço. He also became the fidalgo squire from the Braganza House.

He died on 11 January 1827, in Rio de Janeiro.

== Honors ==
=== Titles ===
The coat of arms of Vila Real da Praia Grande

Caetano Pinto was nominated Baron, Viscount and Marquis of Vila Real da Praia Grande by Dom Pedro I.

In 1808 he became a Comendator of the Order of Christ and Knight of Cape and Spade from the Finance Council.

=== Homages ===
In 1808, Antônio Bernardino Pereira do Lago built the Montenegro Fort in his honor.

There is a street with his name in Jardim do Marquês, Jacareí.
