= José Paulino de Almeida e Albuquerque =

Brazilian politician

Congressman for the General Assembly
- In office May 1830 – 24 December 1830
- Monarch: Pedro I of Brazil

President of the Province of Rio Grande do Norte
- In office 21 February 1827 – 10 March 1830
- Monarch: Pedro I of Brazil
- Preceded by: Antônio da Rocha Bezerra
- Succeeded by: Antônio da Rocha Bezerra

Personal details
- Born: Recife, State of Brazil
- Died: 24 December 1830 Recife, Empire of Brazil
- Spouse: Maria Alvares de Almeida e Albuquerque
- Parents: Manuel Caetano de Almeida e Albuquerque (father); Ana Francisca Eufemia do Rosário (mother)
- Military career
- Allegiance: United Kingdom of Portugal, Brazil and the Algarves; Empire of Brazil
- Branch: Brazilian Army
- Rank: Captain

José Paulino de Almeida e Albuquerque (? – 24 December 1830) was a Brazilian soldier and politician.

Born in Recife, Paulino was part of the armed forces of Brazil and was also a Freemason. He was arrested under the accusation of conspiring against Dom João VI, but was later released. After the Independence of Brazil, he was named President of the Province of Rio Grande do Norte by Dom Pedro I and later became a Congressman for the General Assembly. He was murdered on 24 December 1830 by a blunderbuss shot while taking care of a legal issue in Recife.

== Biography ==
Paulino de Albuquerque was born in an unknown date in the freguesia of Santíssimo Sacramento da Vila do Recife. He was the son of Manuel Caetano de Almeida e Albuquerque and Ana Francisca Eufemia do Rosário, brother of the politician Manuel Caetano de Almeida e Albuquerque and nephew of José Vitoriano Borges da Fonseca, Captain-General of the Captaincy of Ceará. He was married with Maria Alvares de Almeida e Albuquerque.

Paulino was an artillery officer and in 1822 was the Captain of the 1st Regiment of the Militia Cavalry.

Paulino was a freemason, member of the Sociedade dos Pedreiros-Livres (Freemason Society). In 1816, shortly before the Pernambucan Revolt, a slave reported him and Antonio Vieira Cavalcante to the authorities as being one of the conspirators against the kingship of Dom João VI. The slave was freed and they were arrested by Paulo Fernandes Viana and sent to the Snake Island. Paulino was freed on 14 February of the same year.

On 13 September 1826, Paulino was named by Dom Pedro I as President of the Province of Rio Grande do Norte, substituting Antônio da Rocha Bezerra. He officially became the president on 21 February 1827 and left his post on 10 March 1830. During his term, the Correios Administration of Rio Grande do Norte was stablished.

In 1830, Paulino became a congressman for the General Assembly, representing Rio Grande do Norte. During his term, he militated for the freed slaves not to be considered as Brazilian citizens. He was only part of the congress meetings from May to September 1830.

On 24 December of that year, around 8 p.m., Paulino was at the house of the appellate judge Gustavo Adolfo de Aguilar in Ponte de Uchôa, near Recife, dealing with a legal issue when a man riding a horse approached from one of the windows and shot him dead with a blunderbuss. Gustavo Adolfo and one of Paulino's relatives were also wounded, but they survived. The murderer was followed by the townsfolk, but he escaped. The murder was documented in a letter from José Joaquim Vasconcellos to José Antonio da Silva Maia.
