= Igaracy =

Municipality in Paraíba, Brazil

- Municipality
- Municipality of Igaracy
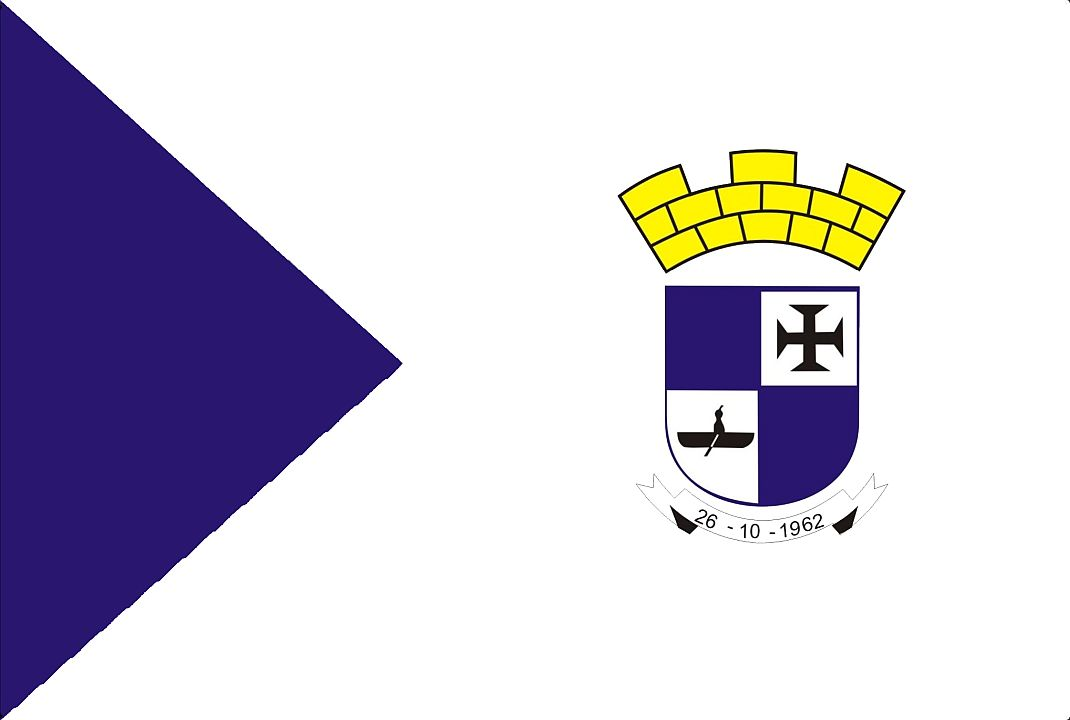
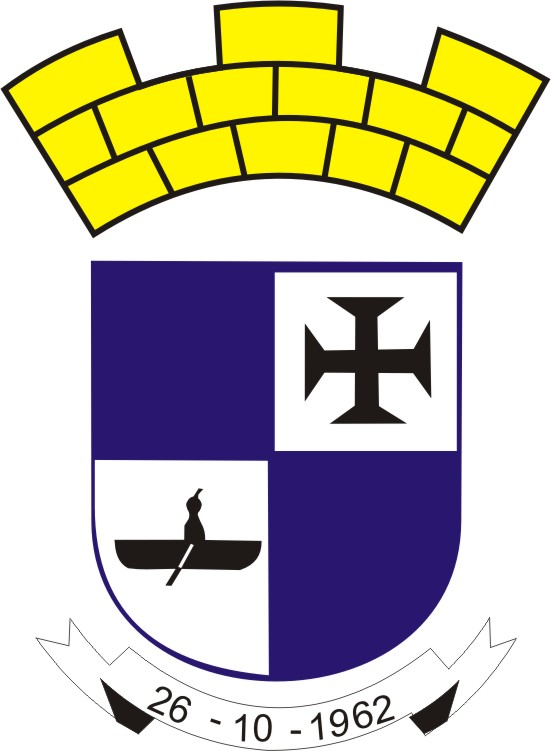
- Flag Coat of arms

- Location of Igaracy within Paraíba

- Location in Brazil
- Coordinates: 7°10′51″S 38°8′56″W
- Country: Brazil
- Region: Northeast
- State: Paraíba
- Mesoregion: Patos
- Microregion: Itaporanga
- Metropolitan region: Vale do Piancó
- Founded: 26 October 1962

Government
  - Mayor: Lídio Carneiro (PTB)

Area
  - Total: 192.258 km^{2} (74.231 sq mi)
- Elevation: 313 m (1,027 ft)

Population (2010)
  - Total: 6,156
- Demonym: igaraciense
- Time zone: UTC−03:00 (BRT (UTC−3))

Igaracy is a municipality in the state of Paraíba in the Northeast Region of Brazil. It has a land area of 192 kilometers and has a population of 6,156 people.

== Notable people ==
Cícero Valdiran Lins Nobre - Paralympic athlete.

== See also ==
- List of municipalities in Paraíba
