= José de Barros Lima =

- Born: 1764; Recife
- Died: 10 July 1817 (aged 52–53); Recife
- Cause of death: Hanging
- Military career
- Allegiance: State of Brazil; United Kingdom of Portugal, Brazil and the Algarves
- Rank: Captain
- Nickname: Leão Coroado ("Crowned Lion")
- Known for: Starting the Pernambucan revolution

José de Barros Lima (1764 – 10 July 1817), nicknamed the Leão Coroado ("Crowned Lion"), was a Brazilian military officer and politician.

Born in Recife, he started his military career and became a flag bearer. He briefly left the military and became the director of Limoeiro until 1796. Returning to his post, he had his request to become Tenant denied by the government, and went to Lisbon to study mathematics. He came back to the Captaincy of Pernambuco, where he was accepted on a newly formed artillery regiment and reached the rank of captain.

On 6 March 1817, the governor of Pernambuco Caetano Pinto de Miranda Montenegro ordered his arrest under the accusation of conspiring against Dom João VI. José then killed his superior, Captain Manoel Joaquim Barbosa de Castro, thus starting the Pernambucan revolution.

After the fall of the revolution, he was arrested under the accusation of lèse-majesté and was hung on 10 July. His head was exposed on Olinda and his hands were sent to the headquarters of his regiment.

== Biography ==
José de Barros Lima was born in 1764, Recife, Captaincy of Pernambuco, where today São Lourenço da Mata is located.

José began his military career on the Line Regiment of Recife, becoming a flag bearer on 11 April 1783. At university, he studied geometry and went to a class lectured by Manuel Jacinto Nogueira da Gama. He also made the public exams of arithmetic, trigonometry and algebra. He was nicknamed "Leão Coroado" (Crowned Lion) for his intrepidity, bravery and for his baldness. His lack of hair had the format of a crown.

At an unknown date, he was nominated as director of the indigenous village of Limoeiro by Governor Tomás José de Melo. He then quit the military and stayed on his new post up until October 1796.

José then came back to his old post and asked to be promoted to lieutenant. The governmental junta saw him favorably, but his request was denied. He went to Lisbon to study mathematics, and afterward came back to Recife and joined a newly formed artillery regiment. He became a second lieutenant on 8 September 1801, first lieutenant on 9 November 1808 and captain on 12 April 1813. His services were appreciated by Governor Caetano Pinto.

On 6 March 1817, Caetano Pinto ordered the arrest of several people suspected of being part of a conspiracy against King John VI. Captain Manoel Joaquim Barbosa de Castro, his superior, was sent to Forte de São Tiago das Cinco Pontas to arrest José, but he was killed by him instead with a sword strike, thus starting the Pernambucan revolution. José helped to take control of the fort and to build trenches on the nearby streets to stop the advance of the royalist troops.

After the end of the revolution, the interim governor Rodrigo José Ferreira Lobo ordered his arrest together with Domingos Theotonio Jorge Martins Pessoa, Pedro da Silva Pedroso and Antônio Carlos de Andrada under the accusation of lèse-majesté. He was hung on 10 July 1817 together with Domingos Theotonio and the priest Pedro de Souza Tenório. His head was exposed in Olinda and his hands were sent to the headquarters of his regiment. The rest of his body was tied to a horse and dragged through the streets until it reached the cemetery.

== Homages ==
With the Law No. 199 of 18 March 1917, the centenary of his death, the mayor of São Lourenço da Mata, Captain Eurico do Nascimento Valois, renamed the square Pátio da Estação to Praça Leão Coroado. A statue of him fighting a lion was created by Bibiano Silva. He received homages in 2017, on the bicentenary of his death, by the samba school Bloco da Saudade and the Masonic lodge Segredo e Verdade VI.
