= Luís do Rego, 1st Viscount of Geraz do Lima =

Portuguese General

His Lordship The Viscount of Geraz do Lima ComTE ComC
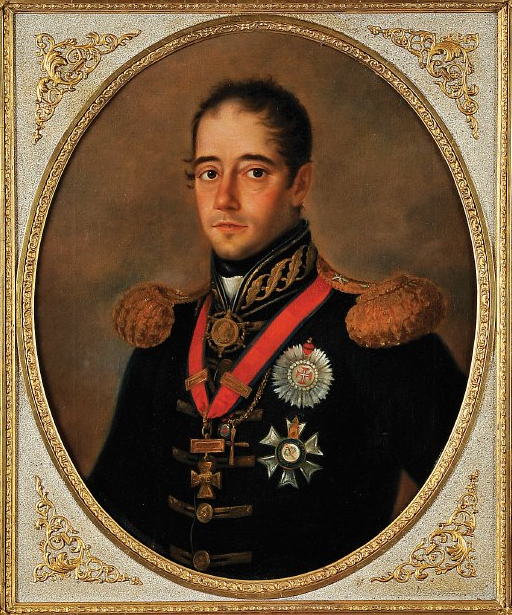

Governor of Pernambuco
- In office 1 July 1817 – 5 October 1821
- Preceded by: Caetano Pinto de Miranda Montenegro
- Succeeded by: Gervásio Pires (as president of the 3rd Government Junta)

Personal details
- Born: 28 October 1777 Viana do Castelo, Portugal
- Died: 7 September 1840 (aged 62) Vila Real, Portugal
- Awards: Commander of Order of Christ; Commander of Order of the Tower and Sword; Peninsular War Gold Cross

Military service
- Allegiance: Portugal
- Years of service: 1790–1838
- Rank: Tenente-general
- Commands: 4th Caçador Battalion of Beira (1809); 15th Infantry Regiment (1812); Division of Volunteers Loyal to the King (1817)
- Battles/wars: Peninsular War; Battle of Buçaco; Battle of Pombal; Battle of Fuentes de Oñoro; Siege of Almeida; Siege of Ciudad Rodrigo; Siege of Badajoz; Battle of Salamanca; Battle of Vitoria; Siege of San Sebastián; Battle of the Bidassoa; Battle of the Nivelle; Battle of the Nive; Battle of Bayonne

D. Luís do Rego Barreto, 1st Viscount of Geraz do Lima (28 October 1777 – 7 September 1840) was a Portuguese nobleman, military officer and colonial administrator who distinguished himself in the fight against the Invasion of Portugal by the French in 1807, and was Governor of Pernambuco from 1817 to 1821, when he was deposed.

== Early life ==
Natural son of António do Rego Barreto, army officer, adjutant of the 2nd Count of Bobadela when he was governor das armas of Minho, was legitimized by his father in 1786, enlisted in 1790 at age 13, at the Infantry Regiment of Lippe, the Lisbon garrison, being lieutenant when the French invaded Portugal in 1807.

Having asked to resign when the Portuguese army, it was reorganized in early 1808, he returned to Viana do Castelo. When Porto rose against collaboration with the French occupiers, Luís organized a provisional government junta in Viana do Castelo, who promoted him to major and instructed to organize the 9th Infantry Regiment, garrison of the city.

== Peninsular War ==
Organized the 4th Caçador Battalion of Beira, in Viseu, having participated with him in the 1808–1811 campaigns, the Battle of Buçaco, in 1810, to Battle of Pombal, in the beginning of the withdrawal of the army of Masséna, and the Battle of Fuentes de Oñoro in 1811. Participated in the Siege of Ciudad Rodrigo and, as commander of 15th Infantry Regiment, the Siege of Badajoz. Was present at the Battle of Salamanca in 1812 and the Battle of Vitoria in 1813. Their performance in the Siege of San Sebastián was critical, able to cross the gulf separating the allied army from the fortress with his regiment and scaled the walls, managing to take it in September 1813. Luís commanded the 3rd Portuguese Brigade of the Army until 1815.

== Governor of Pernambuco ==
In 1817 he was appointed governor of the Captaincy of Pernambuco. He was hated by the local population, because he used violent methods to repress the separatist revolt that broke out there. He promoted hangings, quartering of bodies, firing squads, deaths by fire, desecration of corpses and rapes. Many of the executed individuals were innocents. With the change of government that took place in Portugal in 1820, he did fulfill the orders of constitutional government in Lisbon. Victim of an assassination attempt, he returned to Portugal in 1821.

== Back in Portugal ==
Luís do Rego was appointed governador das armas of Minho by the constitutional government, he was in charge of crushing the revolt of the 2nd Count of Amarante, future Marquis of Chaves, who defeated Amarante in February 1823. With the Vilafrancada reimposing the absolutist regime in Portugal, he was removed from office and deported to Figueira da Foz, and retired in the following year. He reentered the army during the regency of Maria II of Portugal, he was promoted to lieutenant general in 1827.

Arrested during the reign of King Miguel, he managed to escape to Spain, returning after the Concession of Evoramonte. Appointed member of the Supreme Council of Military Justice in 1834, he was reappointed governor of weapons of Minho during the setembrismo, who appointed him senator for Viana do Castelo, during the short duration of the 1838 Constitution.

The setembrista government of Maria II awarded him the title of Viscount of Geraz do Lima on 27 April 1835.

== Promotions and Units ==
Rank	Unit	Date
Governor	Governor of weapons of Minho	1836
Voting Member	Supreme Council of Military Justice	1834
Lieutenant General		1827
Major General reformed		4 July 1824
Governor	Governor of weapons of Minho	September 1821
Governor	Captaincy of Pernambuco	1817
Commandant	Division of Volunteers Loyal to the King	1817
Major General		
Commandant	3rd Portuguese Brigade of the Army	
Brigadier		22 May 1817
Colonel	15th Infantry Regiment	5 January 1812
Lieutenant Colonel	4th Caçadores Battalion of Beira	21 January 1809
Major	9th Infantry Regiment	1808
Member	Provisional Government Junta of Viana do Castelo	20 June 1808
Lieutenant	Infantry Regiment of Lippe	24 June 1807
Ensign	Grenadiers, Infantry Regiment of Lippe	24 June 1806
Ensign	1st Company, Infantry Regiment of Lippe	24 June 1802
Cadet Flag-carrier	Infantry Regiment of Lippe	26 June 1798
Cadet	Infantry Regiment of Lippe	31 October 1792
Voluntary Soldier	Infantry Regiment of Lippe	11 February 1790

== Sources ==
http://www.arqnet.pt/exercito/regobarreto.html (translated)
