= Forte de São João Batista do Brum =

Brazilian fort

- Forte de São João Batista do Brum
- Recife, Pernambuco in Brazil
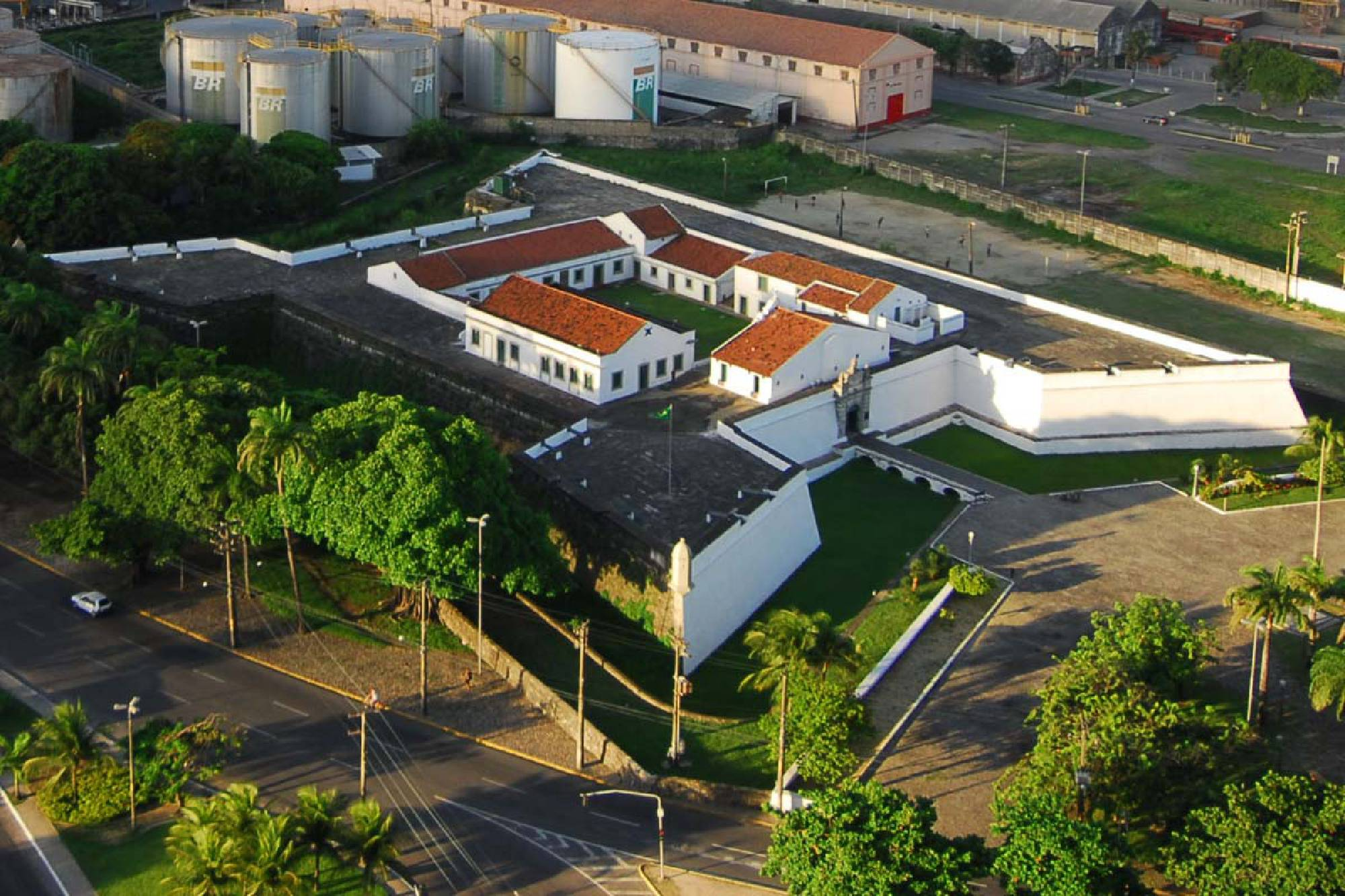

Site information
- Type: Fort
- Open to the public: Yes

Location
- Location of Forte do Brum in Brazil
- Coordinates: 8.052472°S 34.870778°W

Forte de São João Batista do Brum (often simply Forte do Brum) is a fort located in Recife, Pernambuco in Brazil.

== See also ==
- History of Pernambuco
