= Beberibe River =

River in Pernambuco, Brazil

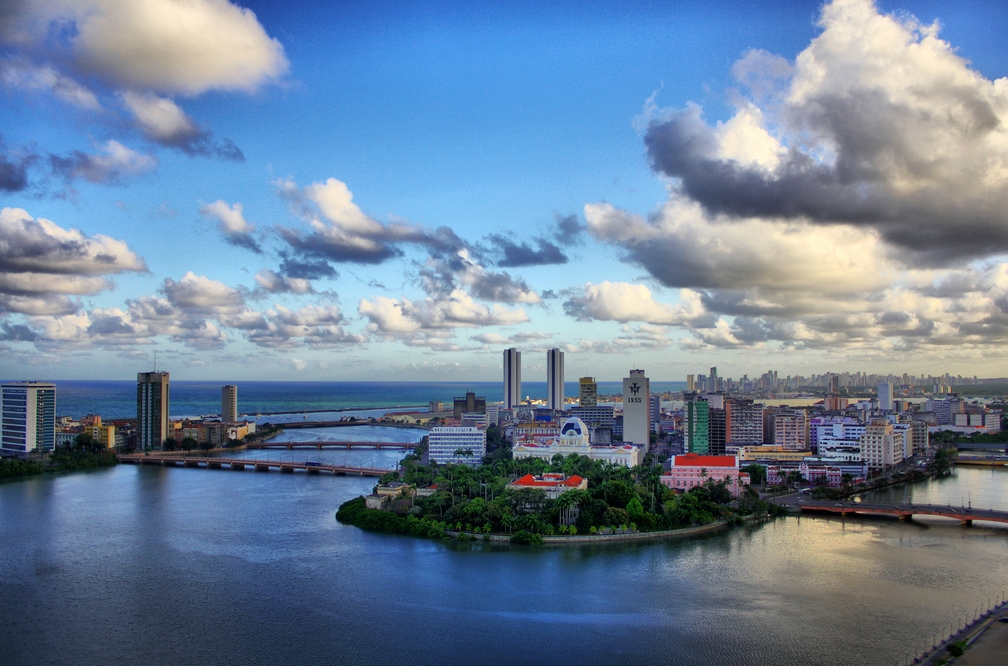
- The Beberibe and Capibaribe rivers meet in central Recife

- Location of mouth

Location
- Country: Brazil
- State: Pernambuco

Physical characteristics
- Source
  - location: Camaragibe
- Mouth
  - location: Atlantic Ocean
  - coordinates: 8°02′23″S 34°52′03″W
  - elevation: 0 m (0 ft)
- Length: 23.7 km (14.7 mi)
- Basin size: 81 km^{2} (31 sq mi)

The Beberibe River is a river located in Pernambuco, Brazil. The river rises in the city of Camaragibe from the confluence of the rivers Araçá and Pacas, and is 23.7 km long. Its drainage basin measures 81 square kilometers and includes the following cities: Recife (65%), Olinda (21%) and Camaragibe (14%). Today, the main tributaries are the channels Euclides, Malaria, and Vasco da Gama, which are all located within Greater Recife. The Beberibe meets the Capibaribe River near the end of Aurora Street to flow into the Atlantic Ocean. Recife's eponymous Beberibe neighborhood is located upon the river. The name comes from Tupi. There are multiple theorized meanings of Beberibe, one being where the sugar cane grows.
