= Antônio Carlos Ribeiro de Andrada =

Brazilian politician (1773–1845)

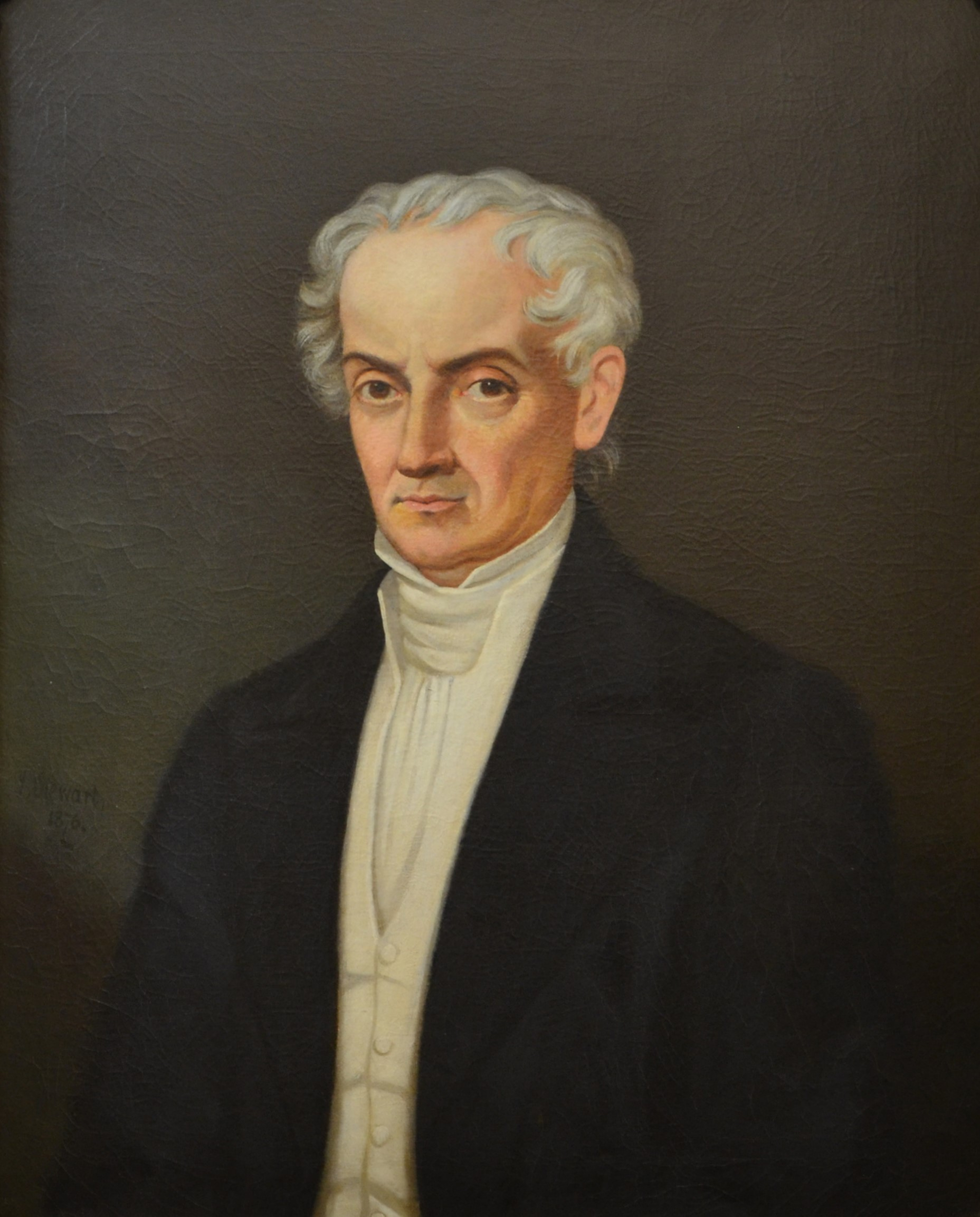

Secretary of State of the Empire Affairs
- In office 24 July 1840 – 27 March 1841
- Monarch: Pedro II
- Preceded by: Joaquim Rodrigues Torres
- Succeeded by: Cândido de Araújo Viana

Personal details
- Born: 11 January 1773 Santos, São Paulo, Colonial Brazil
- Died: 12 May 1845 (aged 72) Rio de Janeiro, Empire of Brazil
- Spouse: Anna Josefina de Andrada e Silva
- Education: University of Coimbra
- Occupation: Politician; judge
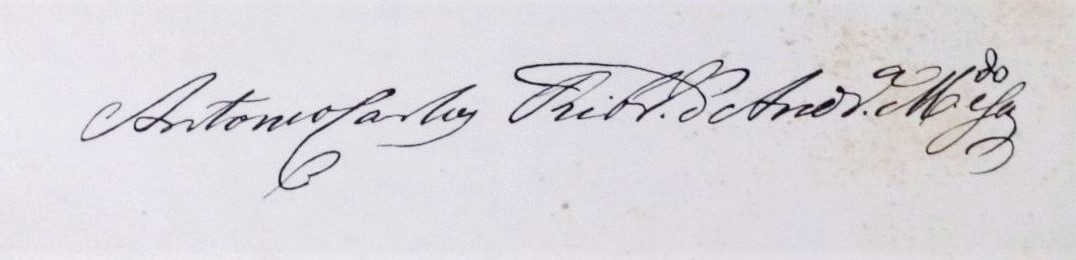
- Signature

Antônio Carlos Ribeiro de Andrada Machado e Silva (1 November 1773 – 5 December 1845) was a Brazilian judge (juiz de fora), appellate judge (desembargador) and politician. At the time of Brazilian Independence, he often used the pseudonym "Philagiosetero" in his newspaper articles. He adopted the parliamentary name of "Andrada Machado".

A brother of José Bonifácio and Martim Francisco, he was known for the scathingness of his speech against despotism and for his involvement in the Pernambuco Revolt, in addition to his extensive involvement and role during the first Constituent Assembly of 1823 that was tasked with drafting Brazil's first constitution.

== Biography ==
=== Early life and education ===
It is possible to say that, of the three Andrada brothers, José Bonifácio, Martim Francisco and Antônio Carlos, the latter received the least attention from modern historiography. While the stories of José Bonifácio and Martim Francisco are well documented, the life, career and trajectory of Antônio Carlos Ribeiro de Andrada Machado e Silva are quite nebulous.

Antônio Carlos was born in Santos in 1773, his parents were Maria Bárbara da Silva and Bonifácio José Ribeiro de Andrada. His father had the second largest fortune in Santos, being an employee of the Portuguese Crown and also a merchant. He received primary education from his own family, including his uncles who were priests, due to the lack of good quality primary schools in Santos. After that, he moved to São Paulo where he would attend classes in philosophy, grammar and rhetoric as a preparatory education for higher education.

Like other members of the colonial elite at the time, Antônio Carlos wanted to pursue a higher education. But taking into account that there were no university institutions in Brazil, he decided to travel to Portugal to then enroll and study at the University of Coimbra. His arrival in the metropolis coincided with "the period of opening to new ideas due to the initiatives of the Marquis of Pombal". He left Brazil in search of higher education in 1790 to then enroll in courses in Law and Natural Philosophy. It would be there that he would also end up joining the educated elites of Portugal who were also studying.

Antônio Carlos was one of the literate judges who came from the University of Coimbra to then be appointed to a position as a magistrate in Brazil. Upon finishing the course, individuals could request a reading that opened access to the career to compete for the "places of letters". Between the years 1750 and 1808, 3,882 of the bachelors applied for these positions, but only 2,165 passed. Among those who passed, 558 became juiz de fora; 43 ombudsmen and 31 desembargadores. Antônio Carlos was one of these judges.

=== Arco Cego Typography ===
While his brother José Bonifácio, after finishing his higher studies at the University of Coimbra, became a member of the Royal Academy of Sciences of Lisbon, which was a liaison center for the reformist ideas of the government of Maria I, Antônio Carlos did not succeed in becoming a member of the institution. He and his other brother, Martim Francisco, would later join the Arco Cego Typography, created by the Overseas Minister in 1799. The typography had as its main associate the naturalist and friar José Mariano da Conceição Veloso, who was immensely concerned with propagating practical and useful knowledge. Antônio Carlos stood out as one of the main translators of these works that offered useful knowledge, especially those dealing with agriculture and how to practice it in different nations and cultures. Translating and publishing these efforts was part of an effort to achieve the regeneration of the Portuguese Empire, by taking better advantage of its colonies.

Among the works translated by Antônio Carlos are: Cultura Americana (1799- vol. 2); Proposals for Forming by Subscription in the Metropolis of the British Empire a Public Institution (1799); Candid and impartial considerations on the nature of the sugar trade, and comparative importance of the British and French isles of the West Indies, in which value is established, and consequences of the islands of Santa Luzia, and Grenada (1800); and Treatise on the Improvement of Canal Navigation by Roberto Fulton (1800).

The production and organization of the typography was part of the political and scientific reformist program that Rodrigo de Sousa Coutinho, the Count of Linhares created to bring together scholars from Portugal, who may or may not have been born in the metropolis, in order to promote the modernization of the Empire. Antônio Carlos belonged, like the majority, to the group of colonial illustrators of the Count of Linhares who defended the creation of a Luso-Brazilian empire based in Brazil, its richest colony, to end the crisis that took place in the metropolis.

Having in their curriculum the scientific training at the University of Coimbra and the participation in the Arco Cego Typography, both brothers Antônio Carlos and Martim Francisco entered the illustrated elite that was interested in the study of man and nature, thanks to the reformist program of scientific exploration. Both were appointed by the Minister of the Navy and Overseas, Rodrigo de Souza Coutinho, to then assume positions considered important for the administration of the Portuguese Empire in its centrality, to then apply, in an efficient and firm way, the current reformist policy. A collaboration was then established between the so-called "men of science" and "men of politics", that is, between those who produced scientific knowledge and those who combined financial resources and support, so necessary for science and its development.

=== Return to Brazil ===
==== Legal career and Pernambuco revolt ====
Both Antônio Carlos and Martim Francisco returned to Brazil in 1800. Once in Brazil, Antônio Carlos dedicated himself to public positions, especially to careers as a judge, ombudsman, and appellate judge, that is, careers in the judiciary itself. He first became a judge in Santos, then became an ombudsman and magistrate in Olinda, as well as a judge in Bahia. In 1811, he replaced the judge Miguel Antônio de Azevedo Veiga as Ombudsman of the São Paulo comarca.

In 1812, Antônio Carlos became a member of a Masonic lodge called Distintiva that was located in the parish of São Gonçalo, in Niterói. Alongside him would were members José Mariano Cavalcanti de Albuquerque, José Joaquim da Rocha, Luís Pereira da Nóbrega, José Joaquim da Gama Lobo, captain Ornellas and Belchior Pinheiro de Oliveira. The lodge would later be denounced and all its utensils would be thrown into the sea at the behest of Prince Regent John of Portugal.

Antônio Carlos also had an openly slave-owning discourse and, in his speech, he stressed "soft" slavery in Brazil; while commenting on the Haitian Revolution he stated:

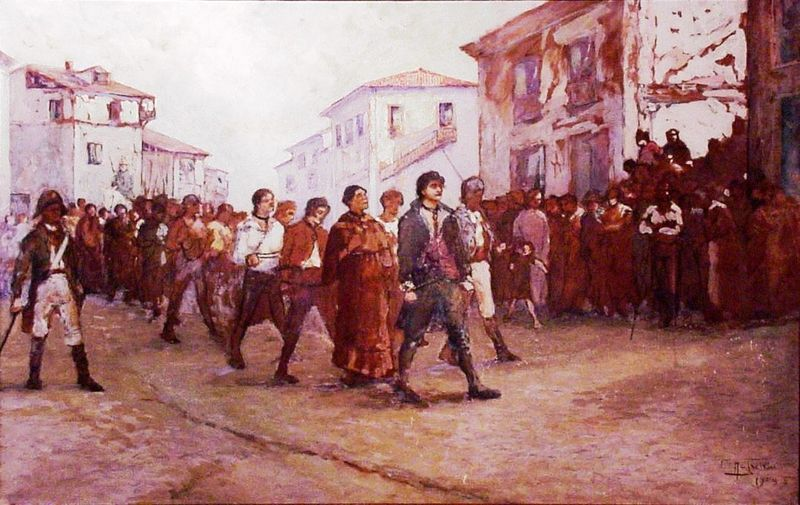
Imprisonment of Antônio Carlos, by Antônio Parreiras

"How ignorant they believe us [to be] so that we receive insults and offenses as a gift! Do we not know better than anyone that slaves are not to be feared, that their number is insignificant compared to that of the free, and that the sweetness of domestic servitude among us has made our slaves friends rather than enemies"?

In 1815, Antônio Carlos ended up being transferred to Pernambuco to occupy the position of ombudsman. Two years later, in 1817, he became involved in the Pernambuco Revolt. While many planters in Pernambuco had monopolistic mercantile practices, heavy taxes were still levied on exportable goods and goods for domestic consumption, such as food. This resulted in Pernambuco's dissatisfaction with the government in Rio de Janeiro, which began to question the centralization of government in Rio. Antônio Carlos' involvement with the movement resulted in his imprisonment for four years. The Court reacted violently against the members of the Pernambuco Revolut, promoting strong repression that ended up causing the arrest and conviction of hundreds of people.

==== Brazilian independence ====
In 1821, his brother, José Bonifácio, prepared the text Memories and Notes of the Provisional Government for the Deputies of the Province of São Paulo (1821), a work to guide the deputies from São Paulo in their work at the Constituent Courts of Lisbon. The deputies elected for São Paulo had Antônio Carlos among its six members. The text that guided their work had no separatist intention, in fact, it believed in the indissolubility of the relationship between Brazil and Portugal, ensuring equality of representation between the general and ordinary courts. The text also had liberal principles, trying to preserve privileges and rights conquered by Brazil since the transfer of the Portuguese court in 1808.

The position that Antônio Carlos occupied in the Portuguese courts was in line with the interests of the elite, which he was a part of and for which constitutionalist ideologies should not weaken the fullness of the Luso-Brazilian Empire. For his position, it was believed that the unity that was established on behalf of the United Kingdom of Portugal, Brazil and the Algarves should be maintained, causing it to assume "a position contrary to European supremacy as defended by the Portuguese deputies in the Cortes, and, mainly, at the end of a government in America." Antônio Carlos then refused to sign the Portuguese constitution approved by the Cortes, and returned to Brazil at the same time in which the process of Brazilian independence began to take place.

==== Role in the 1823 Constituent Assembly ====
After independence, the country changed from a constituent kingdom of the United Kingdom of Portugal, Brazil and the Algarves to the Empire of Brazil. From this moment on, Antônio Carlos assumed an essential position for the political scenario in Brazil. He "played a fundamental role in the first conclave of the founders of the Empire-Nation: the Constituent Assembly of 1823, destined to clash with authoritarian feelings, in contradiction with the libertarian ideas of Pedro I, liberator and popular dictator in a quasi-Roman, Caesarist posture."

Although always faithful to liberalism, Antônio Carlos became increasingly pragmatic and less doctrinaire, preferring to choose to recognize the limits of his adaptation:

"Brazil's cause is the same as that of the constitutional monarchy, which alone can hold us to the edges of the abyss of revolutions that crazy innovators tend to plunge us into... The state of civilization and culture in Brazil, the habits and customs and even the prejudices of Brazilians do not leave open to them another path of prosperity other than this one... I will always be a decided enemy of those who, against the nature of the causes, against experience, want to derail the public opinion in Brazil with republican dreams and chimeras, and for the sake of their precarious fortune to wade rivers of blood, to reach a goal they will never achieve."

In the session of 5 May 1823, when the Constitution Commission was appointed, Antônio Carlos went on to elaborate, together with the other members, the Constitution Project. The commission was made up of Antônio Luiz Pereira da Cunha, José Bonifácio de Andrada e Silva, Francisco Moniz Tavares, Pedro de Araújo Lima, Manoel Ferreira da Câmara, José Ricardo da Costa Aguiar, in addition to Antônio Carlos himself.

Andrada Machado spoke at several different sessions, proposing the amendment of three articles, which were all approved by the vast majority:

Article 14. Each member of the Christian Communion may profess his or her religion in the room designated for that purpose. All who profess these communions can enjoy political rights;

Article 15. The other religions, besides the Christian, are only tolerated, and only the domestic worship belongs to them; and their profession inhibits the exercise of political rights;

Article. 16. The Roman Catholic Apostolic Religion is the Religion of the State, and the only one maintained by it; and it alone is responsible for external worship outside the Churches.

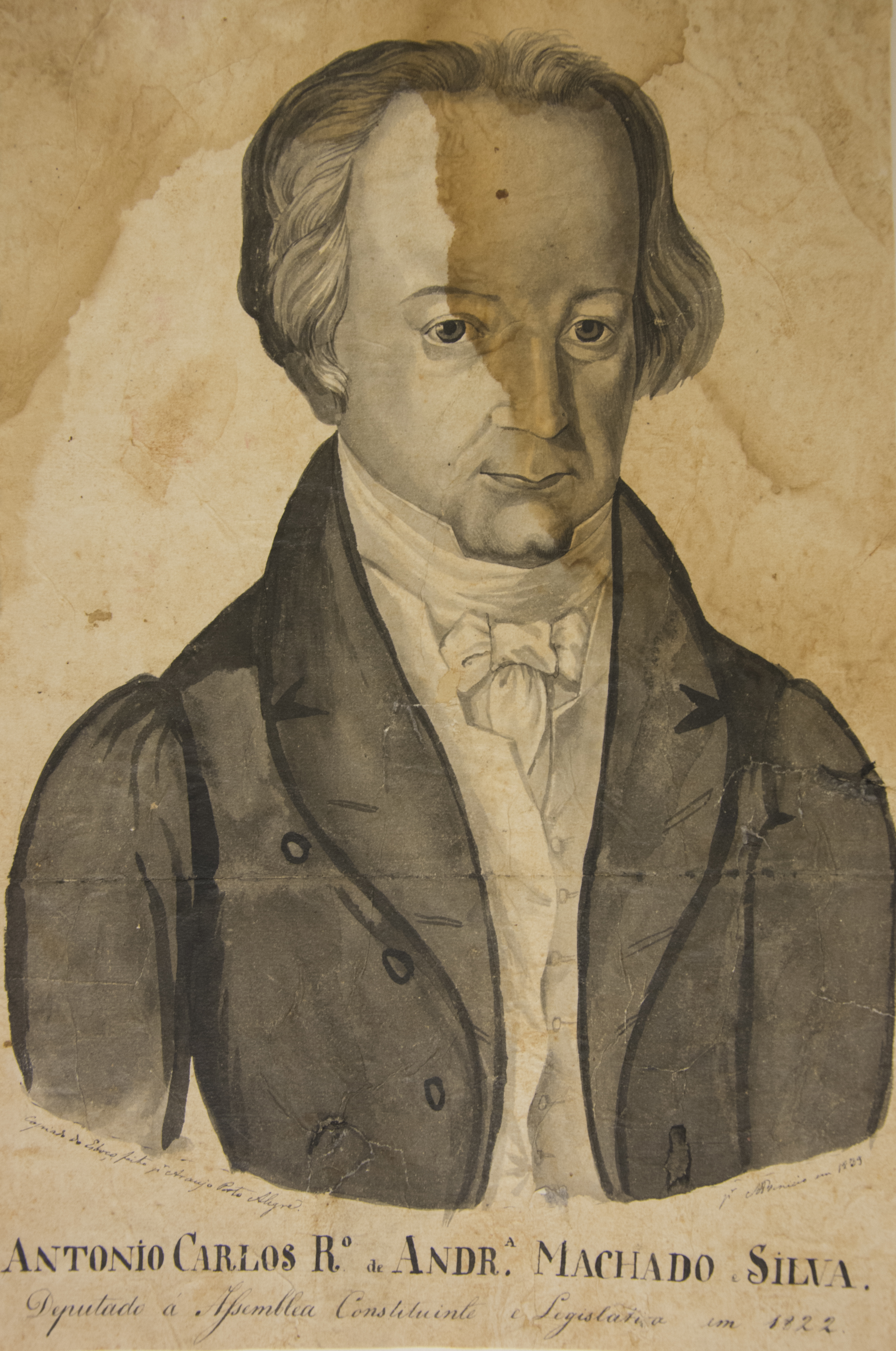
Antônio Carlos, by Miguelzinho Dutra

Antônio Carlos was also the main editor of the draft bill of the Constitution presented to the other deputies. However, the constitutional process in which he participated was not successful, as it was not approved by emperor Pedro I, since it was considered too adjacent to liberal ideas. The Assembly was then dissolved on account of this case.

==== Later life and death ====
For his ideas to continue to advance, Antônio Carlos joined his brothers José Bonifácio and Martim Francisco to create the periodical O Tamoyo in 1823. In this periodical the Andrada brothers showed their opposition to the government of Pedro I. After being exiled with his brothers, Antônio Carlos returned to Brazil in 1828. In 1832 he was appointed, in London, the plenipotentiary minister of Brazil, but ended up refusing the position. In 1833 he returned to Europe and only returned to Brazil in 1838, when he was elected general deputy in São Paulo from 1838 to 1842.

During this time he led the movement that called for the declaration of Pedro II's majority by the Senate. On 21 July 1840 he presented a law project in the Chamber of Deputies that declared the Emperor "an adult since now", which resulted in a political crisis and later the so-called "majority coup". His move resulted in the young emperor Pedro II taking office on July 23, putting an end to the regency period.

Antônio Carlos became Minister of the Empire Affairs, an office akin to that of prime minister, in the so-called "ministry of majority" in 1840. He was later re-elected general deputy. He received the Grand Cross of the Imperial Order of the Cross for the services he performed during his life in relation to the Luso-Brazilian Empire that became the Empire of Brazil. His political life continued until 1845, when he died while in the position of Senator for Pernambuco.
