= Beatriz Francisca de Assis Brandão =

Brazilian writer and poet (1779–1868)

- Born: July 29, 1779; Vila Rica (Ouro Preto), Minas Gerais, Colonial Brazil, Portuguese Empire
- Died: February 5, 1868 (aged 88); Rio de Janeiro, Brazil
- Other names: Beatriz Brandão, Beatriz de Assis, D. Beatriz (pen name)
- Occupations: Poet, translator, musician, educator
- Known for: poetry, early feminism
- Spouse: Vicente Batista Rodrigues Alvarenga (m. 1813 – d. 1839)

Beatriz Francisca de Assis Brandão (29 July 1779 – 5 February 1868) was a Neoclassical or Arcadian Brazilian poet, translator, musician, educator and early feminist. One of the few prominent female intellectuals and artists in Brazil during the reign of Pedro II, she became well known for her poetry, frequently published in Brazilian newspapers. Through her life and work, she challenged the dominant societal roles for women at the time and played an important part in Brazilian social, political and cultural history.

== Biography ==
In 1779, Beatriz Brandão was born into a well-to-do family of European descent in the city of Vila Rica (now Ouro Preto), Minas Gerais in southeast Brazil. Vila Rica, the epicenter of colonial Brazil's gold rush, was built upon this remarkable pioneering mining wealth, and at the time, it was both the capital of the province of Minas Gerais and the largest city in the Portuguese colony of Brazil. In the 18th century, Vila Rica was a vibrant place not only economically but also artistically and politically. As the center of the Baroque architecture movement in Brazil, the historic core of Ouro Preto is a designated UNESCO World Heritage Site. The birthplace of the Inconfidência Mineira or Minas Conspiracy, Ouro Preto was also a center of agitation for Brazil's separation from the Portuguese Empire.

Beatriz Brandão was the sixth and youngest child of dragoon Sergeant Francisco Sanches Brandão and Isabel Feliciana Narcisa de Seixas. The Brandão family had close ties with the Brazilian imperial family, which Beatriz Brandão maintained throughout her life. She was also the first cousin of Maria Joaquina Dorotéia de Seixas, a participant in the Minas Conspiracy and lover of poet Tomás António Gonzaga whom he immortalized in Marília de Dirceu.

She married a lieutenant (later, captain) named Vicente Batista Rodrigues Alvarenga in May 1816, at the age of 33. Later, after living apart from her husband for seven years, Brandão was finally granted a divorce in 1839. Once the divorce was finalized, she moved to the city of Rio de Janeiro, accompanied by a niece and a female slave. She lived in Rio until her death on February 5, 1868.

Alongside her literary activities, Brandão worked throughout her life as an educator in schools for young women to support herself, in both Ouro Preto and Rio de Janeiro. She was an influential advocate for women's right to education in Brazil.

== Literary work ==
Brandão was known in her time for her poetry, prose, and translation work. Early on, she began to translate poems, theatrical works, and other literary pieces from Italian and French into Portuguese. Brandão was one of the writers in Minas Gerais in this period, like Cláudio Manuel da Costa (1729–1789) and Alvarenga Peixoto (1744–1793), who copied, translated, and adapted works of contemporary Italian and French playwrights like Pietro Metastasio.

Brandão published her poems in several Brazilian newspapers throughout her career, often signing them "D. Beatriz" (Dona Beatriz). Brandão became prolific in her poetry after moving to Rio de Janeiro and achieved recognition through publication. Between 1852 and 1857, the Rio newspaper Marmota Fluminese alone published 38 of her poems. Her poetry was also published in a number of collected volumes, including Januário da Cunha Barbosa's Parnaso Brasileiro volumes beginning in 1831. She also published several collections of her poems, the first of which–Cantos da mocidade (Songs of Youth)–was printed in 1856.

Unfortunately, the majority of Brandão's work is either lost because it was published in such limited volumes that none survive today or remains unknown because it has been left unpublished. This includes about 500 pages of unpublished poetry.

Her native city, Ouro Preto, established a biennial prize in her honor in 2005 to recognize women who have made a significant contribution in the area in education and the arts.

== Selected works ==
=== Poetry ===
- Cantos da mocidade. Rio de Janeiro: Typ. Dous de Dezembro de Paula Brito, 1856. 232 pp.
- Cartas de Leandro e Hero, extrahidas de uma traducção franceza. Rio de Janeiro: Typ. e livraria de B. X. P. de Sousa, 1859. 44 pp.
- Romances imitados de Gesner. Typ. e livraria de B. X. P. de Sousa. 32 pp.
- Lágrimas do Brasil. Poesia em versos hendecassílabos no mausoléu levantado à memória da excelsa rainha de Portugal, dona Estefânia, Rio de Janeiro, 1860.
- As Comendas. Poesias, Rio de Janeiro, s. d.
- "Poesias" in.: BARBOSA, Januário da Cunha, Parnaso brasileiro ou colecção das melhores poesias dos poetas do Brasil, tanto inéditas, como já impressas, Rio de Janeiro, Tipografia Nacional, 1831, volume 2, cad. 5, pp. 27–38
- "Carta de Leandro a Hero, traduzida do francês e dedicada à Senhora D. Delfina Benigna da Cunha e Carta de Hero a Leandro" in.: BARBOSA, Januário da Cunha, Parnaso brasileiro ou colecção das melhores poesias dos poetas do Brasil, tanto inéditas, como já impressas, Rio de Janeiro, Tipografia Nacional, 1831, volume 2, cad. /, pp. 7–28

=== Drama ===
- Catão, tragic drama by Pedro Metastasio (translated from Italian). Typ. e livraria de B. X. P. de Sousa, 1860. 136 pp.
- Saudação à estátua equestre de S. M. I. o senhor D. Pedro I, fundador do Império do Brasil. Rio de Janeiro, Tip. Paula Brito, 1862.

=== Lost works ===
- Dramma per musica á Coroação de S. M. O sr. D. Pedro I
- Dramma per musica no Nascimento do sr. D. Pedro II
- Cantata aos annos da imperatriz a sr.ª D. Leopoldina
- Alexandre na India by Pedro Metastasio, translation
- Semiramis reconhecida by Pedro Metastasio, translation
- José no Egypto by Pedro Metastasio, translation
- Angelica e Medoro by Pedro Metastasio, translation
- Diana e Endemião by Pedro Metastasio, translation
- Sonho de Scipião by Pedro Metastasio, translation
