= Maria Helena Rosas Fernandes =

Brazilian composer, pianist and conductor

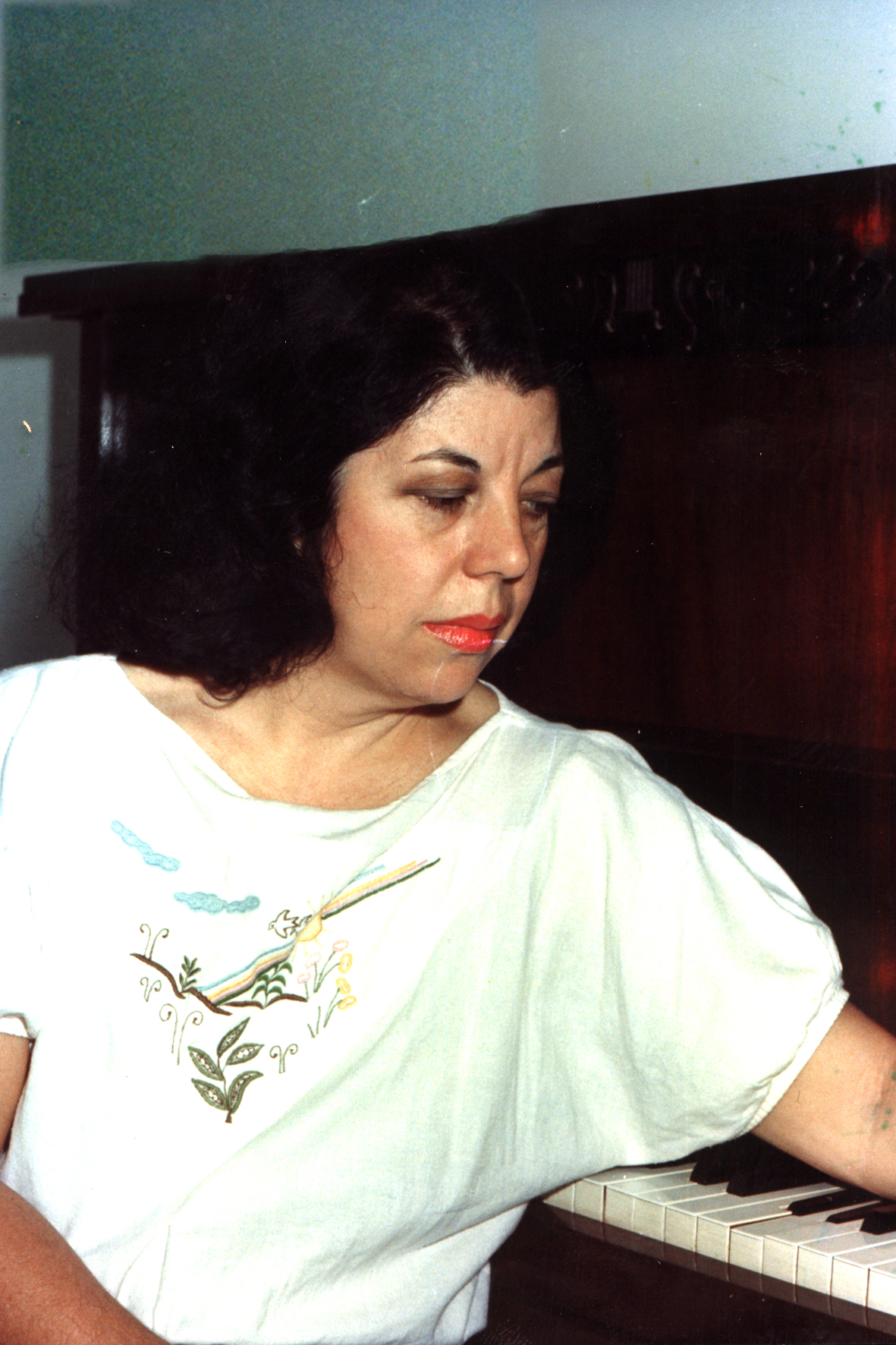
- Maria Helena Rosas Fernandes, undated
- Born: 8 July 1933 (age 93); Brazópolis, Minas Gerais, Brazil
- Education: Conservatório Brasileiro de Música (piano, 1964); Escola Superior de Música Santa Marcelina (composition and conducting, 1977)
- Occupations: Composer; pianist; conductor; music educator; musicologist
- Awards: Nancy Van de Vate International Composition Prize for Opera (2006); APCA Award for body of work (2013); Funarte Mestras e Mestres das Artes Prize (2023)
- Website: www.rosasfernandes.com

Maria Helena Rosas Fernandes (born 8 July 1933) is a Brazilian composer, pianist, conductor, music educator and musicologist. She has written solo, chamber, orchestral, choral, vocal and operatic music. From the late 1970s, Indigenous Brazilian songs, ritual accounts and instrumental sounds became recurring materials in her compositions. She worked from recordings and transcriptions gathered by anthropologists, adapting the material for concert instruments and voices.

Fernandes completed the higher piano course at the Conservatório Brasileiro de Música in 1964 and graduated in composition and conducting from the Escola Superior de Música Santa Marcelina in 1977. She taught music in Campinas from 1964 to 1993 and began composing in 1970. Her early scores consist mainly of short piano and choral works. Later compositions use changing metres, polyrhythm, dissonance, birdsong and extended instrumental techniques. The five-part orchestral work Wãnĩ A'Ama (1982), which she called an "Indigenous symphony", combines material attributed to six Indigenous peoples with dense orchestral textures and an unstable pulse.

Three of her compositions received prizes in 1979: the piano work Ciclo, the chamber work Territórios e ocas and Dawawa Tsawidi for winds and percussion. Her wind quintet Nakutnak won a Latin American composition competition in Montevideo in 1988. The opera Marília de Dirceu received the Nancy Van de Vate International Composition Prize for Opera in 2006. Fernandes wrote two further operas, Anita Garibaldi and Leopoldina, a Imperatriz do Brasil, using her own librettos. In 1993, she founded the Encontro Internacional de Mulheres Compositoras, which brought composers together for concerts, lectures and discussions in Rio de Janeiro, São Paulo and Poços de Caldas.

Fernandes moved to Poços de Caldas in 2002 and founded the free concert program Encontros com a Música there in 2006. She received the APCA award for her career in 2013, honorary citizenship of Poços de Caldas in 2023 and the Funarte Mestras e Mestres das Artes Prize the same year. At the age of 90, she was still composing and curating concerts. The University of Campinas holds more than sixty of her scores, donated to its contemporary-music documentation centre in 2018. The archive has supported performances, musicological studies and new editions of her music.

== Early life and education ==
Fernandes was born on 8 July 1933 in Brazópolis, in southern Minas Gerais. Her mother, an amateur pianist, gave her first piano lessons when she was about six years old. Music was a familiar part of her mother's family life: relatives played instruments, sang at home and collected piano reductions of operas.

She spent part of her childhood in Paraisópolis, Minas Gerais, returned to Brazópolis in 1944 and moved to Itajubá in 1950, where she completed a normal-school course at the Escola Normal Sagrado Coração de Jesus. Seeking more advanced musical training, she studied at conservatories in Minas Gerais and completed the professional piano course of the Conservatório Brasileiro de Música in 1958.

Fernandes initially travelled to Rio de Janeiro for lessons before moving there in 1960. At the Conservatório Brasileiro de Música she studied piano with Elzira Amabile and musical initiation with Liddy Chiaffarelli Mignone, who arranged a scholarship for her. Fernandes completed the conservatory's higher piano course in 1964 and then settled in Campinas.

Her composition studies began in 1966 with Osvaldo Lacerda, whose free course she attended in Campinas and São Paulo until 1977. She also took advanced piano lessons with João de Sousa Lima from 1970 to 1973. At the University of Campinas, she attended extension courses in music education, conducting, harmony and composition with Hans-Joachim Koellreutter in 1971, followed by composition classes with Almeida Prado from 1976 to 1978. While pursuing these courses, she completed a bachelor's degree in composition and conducting at the Escola Superior de Música Santa Marcelina in 1977.

== Career ==
=== Teaching and first compositions, 1964–1977 ===
Fernandes taught music in Campinas from 1964 to 1993. She worked at the Conservatório Musical de Campinas, Conservatório Musical Carlos Gomes, Instituto Educacional Ave Maria, Escola de Artes Pró-Música and the music faculty of the Catholic University of Campinas. She taught harmony and musical analysis at the conservatories and, in 1968, theory and practice of musical initiation at the university. She also conducted children's choirs and trained teachers in methods of early music education. She served as president of the Grêmio Campinas Cultura e Arte and wrote and presented theatre pieces for children.

Her first compositions date from 1970, when she was still studying with Lacerda. Her output through 1977 consisted chiefly of short piano pieces using established forms alongside chromatic, atonal and twelve-note materials. Works from these years include Prelúdio (1973), Polca (1974), Modinha (1975) and Imagens (1977), her first orchestral score.

=== Indigenous music and composition prizes, 1977–1992 ===
Fernandes's engagement with Indigenous Brazilian music began in 1977. Lacerda had asked her to write an instrumental quartet based on a Brazilian theme, and her search for source material brought her to the research archive of the Hungarian-born anthropologist Desidério Aytai. She used material from the archive in Territórios e ocas, for string quartet and percussion, and returned to Indigenous subjects in Maráwawa, Dapraba, Dawawa Tsawidi, Wamarĩ and the orchestral works Wãnĩ A'Ama and Tainahyky.

Her sources were writings, transcriptions and field recordings made by Aytai and other anthropologists, including Vera Penteado Coelho and César Albisetti. They contained music recorded among Xavante, Karajá and Tiriyó communities. Fernandes did not carry out anthropological or ethnomusicological fieldwork herself. She studied the material, wrote about Indigenous vocal polyphony and spoke at musical and anthropological meetings in Brazil and abroad.

Three compositions earned prizes in 1979. Ciclo received second place and publication in the first Brazilian competition for classical piano or guitar composition, organized by Funarte and Irmãos Vitale. Territórios e ocas took second place in the Esso Classical Music Prize, while Dawawa Tsawidi won the first Latin American composition competition held by the Música Nova Ensemble at the Federal University of Bahia. In 1988, her wind quintet Nakutnak won the III Latin American Composition Competition organized by Uruguay's SODRE in Montevideo.

Her work was presented at editions of the Panorama da Música Brasileira Atual and the Brazilian Contemporary Music Biennial. In 1992 she took part in the Internationales Festival Komponistinnen in Heidelberg, a festival devoted to music by women composers.

=== International activity and women composers, 1993–2001 ===
In 1993, Fernandes founded the Encontro Internacional de Mulheres Compositoras in Rio de Janeiro. The meeting gave Brazilian and foreign composers a place to present their music through concerts, lectures, papers and round-table discussions. Further editions were held in São Paulo in 1995 and Poços de Caldas in 2004.

Fernandes completed the three-act opera Marília de Dirceu in 1994, to a libretto by Isolde Helena Brans. The opera is based on the life of Maria Doroteia Joaquina de Seixas Brandão, the woman addressed in Tomás António Gonzaga's poems.

At the international Brazil–Europe 500 Years congress in Cologne in September 1999, Fernandes presented a paper on polyphony in the music of Indigenous Brazilian peoples. The congress also held a workshop devoted to Brazilian women composers whose music drew on Indigenous subjects; Ensemble Brasil-Europa performed Dawawa Tsawidi. Her paper was published the following year.

=== Poços de Caldas and later career ===
Fernandes moved to Poços de Caldas in 2002. In 2006, Marília de Dirceu won the Nancy Van de Vate International Composition Prize for Opera. The award carried a cash prize and publication of the score; entries had been submitted by women composers of sixteen nationalities from five continents.

That year she created Encontros com a Música, a Poços de Caldas concert project offering free performances of classical music. Fernandes remained its curator through its 2024 season, when concerts were given at the Thermas Antônio Carlos and the city's historical and geographical museum.

Her compositions from the 2000s and 2010s encompass orchestral, chamber and stage works. She wrote two more operas, Anita Garibaldi and Leopoldina, a Imperatriz do Brasil, setting her own librettos. At the age of 90 in 2023, she was still composing, curating concerts and arranging exchanges between Brazilian and foreign women composers.

== Music ==
Fernandes has written for a wide range of performers, from solo instruments and chamber groups to chorus, symphonic band, orchestra and opera. Many of her works grow from an idea beyond music itself, such as an Indigenous song, a landscape, a historical event, a religious text or the call of a bird. She then uses that starting point to form the work's rhythms, form and instrumental colours.

=== Style and compositional periods ===
In her 2016 study of Fernandes's music, Olivato groups the works into three periods: “initiation” (1970–1977), “experimentation” (1977–1982) and “liberation” (from 1983). These names were chosen by Olivato to describe the development of Fernandes's music; they do not appear in the scores themselves.

The first period is made up mainly of short piano pieces and unaccompanied choral works. In pieces such as Prelúdio (1973) and Modinha (1975), familiar forms sit alongside chromatic, modal and non-tonal writing. Short musical ideas often return in altered or fragmented form, and changes of metre allow the music to follow the shape of the melody. Many of the pieces have a three-part design. Her earliest choruses—Nigue-Ninhas (1970), Tatu é caboclo do sul (1970) and Pedreiros (1971)—draw on folk material from Paraíba, Ceará and Rio de Janeiro. Olivato found little comparable use of Brazilian folklore in her later music, despite Fernandes's long period of study with the nationalist composer Osvaldo Lacerda. The period closes with larger works, particularly Imagens (1977), for orchestra, mixed chorus and narrator. Its eight sections set passages from Cecília Meireles's Romanceiro da Inconfidência. The work also anticipates features that Fernandes would return to, including historical subjects, spoken narration and forms built from a series of contrasting scenes.

Her music changed noticeably during the second period, beginning with Territórios e ocas (1977), which she composed after consulting the archive of the anthropologist Desidério Aytai. The works became longer and were often arranged in named sections. Dissonance, overlapping musical lines, polyrhythm, changing metres and transcribed bird calls all became more prominent. Nine of the twelve works that Olivato places in this period draw on Indigenous subjects or musical material. Among them are Maráwawa (1978), Dapraba and Dawawa Tsawidi (both 1979), Wamarĩ (1982) and Wãnĩ A'Ama (1982). She also began returning to earlier pieces and adapting them for different performers; Dawawa Tsawidi, for example, exists in both instrumental and choral versions.

The third period begins in 1983, although Fernandes continued to study conducting and orchestration until 1987. Olivato calls it “liberation”, reflecting the greater freedom that Fernandes said she felt as she came to the end of her formal training. The music generally becomes longer and calls for larger groups of performers. Dense dissonance, layered rhythms and frequent changes of tempo and metre remain important, but the writing also shows close attention to the character and possibilities of each instrument. Nearly every work begins from an identifiable subject. Religious and philosophical ideas appear most often, followed by Indigenous subjects and musical portraits of places and natural scenes. Brasil 92 (1992), for mezzo-soprano and instruments, moves through musical scenes inspired by the Chapada dos Guimarães, the Pantanal and the Sangradouro Indigenous territory. Bird calls fill the first two sections, while the third uses material attributed to Indigenous peoples in Rondônia and to the Bororo.

Fernandes did not commit herself to a single musical system, some passages suggest a tonal centre but blur it with chromatic writing and unresolved dissonance; others use clusters, modes, parallel intervals or short stretches of more clearly tonal music. Olivato therefore places her outside both the nationalist tradition associated with Mário de Andrade and the serial avant-garde, although her music can draw on techniques linked to either one. Several works written after 2010—including the opera Anita Garibaldi, the work for piano and orchestra Encantada and O mundo sonoro das Minas coloniais—return to more consonant harmony and traditional genres.

=== Indigenous Brazilian subjects and materials ===
Fernandes first encountered the Indigenous music that defined many of her works through Aytai's archive in 1977. She did not conduct ethnomusicological fieldwork herself. Instead, she studied written transcriptions and recordings made by Aytai and other researchers, including Vera Penteado Coelho, César Albisetti and George Donahue. She adapted this material for concert voices and instruments. Some works retain words or vocal sounds in Indigenous languages; others begin with a short melody, a rhythm, an instrumental sound or a written account of a ritual and develop it more freely.

Dapraba, a title translated as “morning song”, brings together five melodies sung by Indigenous children in a setting for three-part children's chorus. Fernandes included notes about the songs and a guide to pronunciation. The work draws on material attributed to Xavante, Karajá and Tiriyó communities, placing the melodies within imitative vocal writing and body percussion. The title Dawawa Tsawidi refers to a Xavante “cry of joy or longing”. Its six sections draw on Xavante and Ticuna songs and are scored for flute, clarinet, horn, trumpet, bassoon, percussion and blown bottles. Rather than settling into a regular dance rhythm, the piece layers independent lines, repeated pitches and changing metres. Akauá-se (1998), translated as “The discovery”, begins with a section in an Indigenous language and then turns to Latin polyphony in “O Monte Pascoal”. The closing section, “Comunhão”, brings the two kinds of vocal writing together.

Of these works, Wãnĩ A'Ama has received the most detailed scholarly attention. Its title comes from a Bororo song asking for help in building a hut. Fernandes described the fifteen-minute score as an “Indigenous symphony” in five parts: “A magia da terra”, “O ciclo dos ritos”, “Os cantares de vitória”, “Deus e os incontáveis espíritos se cobrem de prata e flores” and “A pirâmide dos mortos”. The list of sources in the score connects its melodies and sound gestures with Xavante, Karajá, Wapité, Kamayurá, Waiwá and Bororo traditions. The work is therefore not a musical account of one ceremony or community. It brings together material from several anthropological collections and reshapes it as a concert work.

In her study of Wãnĩ A'Ama, Cinthia Pinheiro Alireti describes the borrowed songs as gestures woven into the orchestral texture rather than themes that control the overall form. Alternating and irregular metres, together with passages that have no metre at all, make the music feel less tied to a bar line. Sections that begin with a regular pulse gradually become more unsettled as several rhythms overlap. The winds evoke ritual calls, Indigenous instruments and Karajá animal sounds, while divided strings often add colour or act almost like percussion. Fernandes also asks the players for unusual sounds, including slow vibrato, flutter-tonguing, sul ponticello, glissandi, blows on the backs of string instruments and non-standard clarinet fingerings. The harmony is similarly vivid, with closely spaced dissonances, tritones, layered fourths and fifths, small clusters and brief passages in more than one key or mode at once.

Alireti interprets these features as a late twentieth-century form of Indianism in Brazilian concert music. She contrasts Fernandes's shifting metres, layered textures and partly hidden quotations with the more regular ostinatos and European primitivist approach heard in works by Heitor Villa-Lobos. At the same time, she cautions that presenting Indigenous peoples mainly as a source of national colour can repeat colonial ways of thinking. Her reading places Wãnĩ A'Ama between experimental orchestral writing and an older Brazilian Indianist tradition, while emphasizing the distance between the original sources and Fernandes's adaptation of them.

=== Vocal, choral and operatic music ===
Fernandes wrote for unaccompanied chorus before turning to orchestral music. The folk-based choruses of 1970–71 were followed by works that use Indigenous songs, pronunciation guides and body percussion. Dapraba is written for children's voices, while Wamarĩ (1982) sets three songs derived from Indigenous material for baritone and piano. Her later vocal music often brings different languages and styles into the same work. Akauá-se places an Indigenous language alongside Latin, and In memoriam (2003) uses Latin in a three-part tribute to the musicologist José Maria Neves. Spoken narrators appear in Imagens, Maráwawa and Pau Brasil I, helping to establish a setting or carry the story forward.

Each of Fernandes's three operas centres on a woman from Brazilian history. Marília de Dirceu (1994) is a three-act opera with a prologue and a Portuguese libretto by Isolde Helena Brans. It follows Maria Doroteia Joaquina de Seixas and Tomás António Gonzaga from their engagement to Gonzaga's arrest and exile after the Inconfidência Mineira. The score lasts about ninety minutes and is written for soloists, chorus and a large orchestra. Compared with her orchestral works from the same period, its musical language is more often tonal or modal, with the strings providing much of the support for the voices and winds. The prologue returns to material from Imagens to evoke the mining society of eighteenth-century Vila Rica.

Anita Garibaldi, completed in 2011–12, also has three acts and a prologue, with a libretto by Fernandes. It follows Anita Garibaldi and Giuseppe Garibaldi during the Ragamuffin War and their departure for Italy. Solo scenes alternate with passages for chorus and orchestra, and the harmony and rhythm are more restrained than in many of Fernandes's chamber and orchestral works. A later list of her compositions gives the year as 2012. Fernandes also wrote the libretto for Leopoldina, a Imperatriz do Brasil (2017), a three-act opera lasting about sixty-five minutes. Olivato's 2016 catalogue records no premiere or recording of either Marília de Dirceu or Anita Garibaldi. The prologue from Marília was performed in concert in 2024, but the event was not a complete staging of the opera.

=== Instrumental music ===
Fernandes's orchestral writing expanded from the mixed ensembles of Imagens and Territórios e ocas to the divided strings, larger percussion sections and unusual instrumental sounds of Wãnĩ A'Ama, Ritus (1984) and Hékélaly (1987). The eighteen-minute Hékélaly is a continuous orchestral ballet about an Indigenous woman abducted from her community. Its first part incorporates the whole of Ritus, and the music then passes through scenes titled “O amanhecer na mata”, “A dor de Hékélaly”, “A dança das mulheres”, “A cabana das flautas mágicas”, “Rito dos iniciados”, “Dança dos pajés”, “Chamada para a guerra” and “Rumo à Plêiade”. Bird calls in the flute and clarinet open the work, and changes in orchestral colour, tempo and density guide the listener from one scene to the next.

Her chamber music often revisits the same idea in a new instrumental setting. Nakutnak began as a work for violin and piano in 1980 and was adapted for wind quintet in 1987. The quintet draws on themes attributed to Xetá, Bororo, Mamaindé, Karajá and Xavante sources while keeping the sectional outline of the earlier version. Palácio dos Guarantãs (1989), for string trio, offers six short musical views of an old Brazilian country house; the final section recalls material from the previous five. Dualismo (2000) and Dualismo II (2010) explore writing for two pianos.

Fernandes wrote piano music throughout all three periods. The short pieces Polca, Modinha and Sinhá Marreca were placed at third-year level in Irmãos Vitale's 1983 teaching guide, while the five-part Ciclo (1977) was placed at ninth-year level. Ciclo follows the sun, birds, rain, moon and stars. Ciclo n.º 2 (1983) arranges transcribed Brazilian bird calls around four times of day—night, dawn, day and twilight—and also exists in a version for organ. Ciclo n.º 3 (1984) continues this interest in birdsong with a freer sense of rhythm. In 2024, the University of Campinas published a digital scholarly edition of the piano work Vales e vales II.

Her early flute works include Cantilena n.º 1 (1974), for flute and piano, and Cantilena n.º 2 (1974), for flute and cello. In the first, a long flute melody unfolds over a piano part that gradually becomes more active. The second combines a chromatically blurred tonal centre with cello glissandi, pizzicato and arpeggios. Dreams was written for two guitars in 2001 and shortened for solo guitar in 2004. Its five movements evoke wind, stars, rain, the moon and a “golden lagoon”. A University of Campinas project later prepared new editions of both versions from manuscripts in the CDMC collection.

== Performances, recordings and reception ==
=== Performances and recordings ===
Wãnĩ A'Ama was premiered in 1983 at Sala Cecília Meireles by the Brazilian Symphony Orchestra, conducted by Roberto Duarte. The same orchestra gave the first documented performance of Hékélaly at the ninth Bienal de Música Brasileira Contemporânea in 1991, conducted by Ricardo Prado. At the tenth Bienal in 1993, Brasil 92 was performed at the Gustavo Capanema Palace by mezzo-soprano Cristina Passos with Andrea Ernest Dias, Lucia Morelenbaum, Maria Tereza Madeira, Roberto Cardoso, Lino Hoffmann and Pedro Paiva, conducted by Roberto Victorio.

The University of Campinas Symphony Orchestra returned to Wãnĩ A'Ama in October 2019 during the symposium marking the CDMC's thirtieth anniversary, with Cinthia Alireti conducting. Dualismo II received its premiere at the 2021 Bienal de Música Brasileira Contemporânea, played by Marina Spoladore and Cristiano Vogas at Sala Cecília Meireles. In 2022, the Quarteto Boulanger performed and recorded the three-part Celebração. The recording, on the album Entre brumas e fúrias, was the work's first commercial release.

On 8 March 2024, the Minas Gerais Symphony Orchestra performed Wãnĩ A'Ama at the Palácio das Artes in Belo Horizonte under Ligia Amadio. The same program included the prologue from Marília de Dirceu, sung by Melina Peixoto, and drew an estimated audience of 1,000. The twenty-sixth Bienal de Música Brasileira Contemporânea programmed Ciclo in November 2025, with Kátia Balloussier at the piano.

The released recordings cover only a small portion of the catalogue. Ruth Serrão recorded Ciclo for a 1984 Funarte LP devoted to prize-winning Brazilian piano music. Ensemble Rio recorded the wind-quintet version of Nakutnak for Música brasileira para sopros e piano, issued by Rioarte Digital in 1996. Ensemble Octandre recorded “Comunhão”, the final section of Akauá-se, for the Bologna release Nuove canzoni per il Natale in 2000. Luciana Soares's 2004 Centaur album Brasileira: Piano Music by Brazilian Women contains Prelúdio and Valsa. Sylvia Maltese recorded Vales for Mulheres compositoras: França–Brasil in 2009.

=== Critical and scholarly reception ===
Vasco Mariz placed Fernandes among a “second independent generation” of Brazilian composers and singled out her sustained use of Xavante material. Alireti revised that assessment by examining how Wãnĩ A'Ama changes its borrowed material through rhythmic instability, orchestral texture and extended techniques, while also questioning the colonial language sometimes used to present Indigenous subjects in Brazilian concert music.

Published concert criticism remains scarce. Reviewing the 2009 Bienal, Tom Moore found Vales, performed by Ruth Serrão, sombre throughout its three movements and heard a common minor colouring and insistent repetition in its depictions of love, pain and peace. Camila Fresca's review of the Quarteto Boulanger's 2022 concerts placed Entre brumas e fúrias within the growing performance and recording of concert music by women, though it discussed the album as a whole rather than assessing Celebração separately.

The CDMC at the University of Campinas received more than sixty of Fernandes's scores in 2018. The subsequent edition of Vales e vales II, the new work on the two versions of Dreams, and Alireti's study of Wãnĩ A'Ama have made manuscripts from that archive available for performance and analysis.

== Archives and professional networks ==
=== Maria Helena Rosas Fernandes Collection ===
The Centro de Documentação de Música Contemporânea (CDMC), part of the University of Campinas's Centro de Integração, Documentação e Difusão Cultural (CIDDIC), holds the Maria Helena Rosas Fernandes Collection. CIDDIC describes the holdings as scores by Fernandes for vocal and instrumental forces. The materials reached Unicamp in stages. While preparing a master's dissertation on Fernandes's music, Juliana Delborgo Abra Olivato consulted copies already held by the CDMC and manuscripts kept by the composer in Poços de Caldas. Olivato organized the material with the aid of an unpublished work list prepared by Fernandes and edited by Rodolfo Braido. Her 2016 catalogue consisted of 72 compositions dating through 2014, encompassing solo, chamber, choral, orchestral, band and operatic music.

In April 2018, Fernandes donated more than sixty scores to the CDMC. The Maria Helena Rosas Fernandes Collection is one of the named special collections administered by the centre. Its catalogue records can be searched through Unicamp's Acervus system. The CDMC permits on-site consultation by the public; materials that have not undergone technical processing are available only at the centre, and reproduction of works under copyright requires authorization.

The manuscripts have supported subsequent research, performance and publication. For CIDDIC's 2019 symposium marking the CDMC's thirtieth anniversary, conductor and researcher Cinthia Pinheiro Alireti selected Wãnĩ A'Ama from the donated scores for performance and musicological study. A 2024 Unicamp research project compared and edited two manuscripts of Dreams held under the catalogue numbers MHRF00017, for guitar duo, and MHRF00018, for solo guitar. CIDDIC and the CDMC also issued an electronic edition of the piano work Vales e vales II in 2024, edited by Tadeu Moraes Taffarello with a preface by Olivato.

=== Women-composers meetings ===
Fernandes founded the Encontro Internacional de Mulheres Compositoras (International Meeting of Women Composers) in Rio de Janeiro in 1993. Further editions took place in São Paulo in 1995 and Poços de Caldas in 2004. The three-day meetings combined concerts with lectures, research papers and round-table discussions, bringing together composers from Brazil and other countries.

Music-and-gender scholars Camila Durães Zerbinatti, Isabel Porto Nogueira and Joana Maria Pedro place the meetings among the predecessors of Brazilian networks that later promoted research, documentation and performances concerning women in music.

== Awards and honours ==
Fernandes has received prizes for individual compositions as well as distinctions concerning her career and civic work.

=== Composition prizes ===
| Year | Composition | Competition | Result |
|---|---|---|---|
| 1979 | Ciclo | First Brazilian Competition of Classical Composition for Piano or Guitar, organized by INM–Funarte and Irmãos Vitale | Second prize in the piano category and publication of the score. |
| 1979 | Dawawa Tsawidi | First Latin American Composition Competition of the Música Nova Ensemble, Federal University of Bahia | First prize and the Government of the State of Bahia Prize. |
| 1979 | Territórios e ocas | Esso Classical Music Prize, Rio de Janeiro | Second prize. |
| 1988 | Nakutnak | Third Latin American Composition Competition, organized by SODRE in Montevideo | First prize. |
| 2006 | Marília de Dirceu | Nancy Van de Vate International Composition Prize for Opera | Winner. The prize carried US$1,000 and publication of the score. |

=== Career and civic honours ===
| Year | Distinction | Awarding body | Notes |
|---|---|---|---|
| 2010 | Mérito Cultural Carlos Gomes, in the grades of Comendadora and Chanceler | Sociedade Brasileira de Artes, Cultura e Ensino | Institutional sources also call the distinction the Carlos Gomes commendation. |
| 2013 | Award for body of work (conjunto da obra) | São Paulo Association of Art Critics | Part of the association's 2013 classical-music awards. |
| 2023 | Honorary citizenship of Poços de Caldas | Municipal Council of Poços de Caldas | Authorized by municipal legislative decree and presented during the council's December 2023 honorary sessions. |
| 2023 | Funarte Mestras e Mestres das Artes Prize | Funarte | Fernandes was one of nine music recipients selected from 182 nominations in that field. The national program honoured fifty arts professionals aged sixty or older. The recipients were formally presented with the award in July 2024. |

== Selected works ==
Fernandes had completed at least 72 compositions by 2016. The two works titled Nakutnak have different dates and scoring: the 1980 composition is for violin and piano, while its 1987 adaptation is for wind quintet. Pau Brasil I, II and III are separately scored compositions rather than alternate editions of a single work.

=== Operas ===
| Year | Work | Scoring | Details |
|---|---|---|---|
| 1994 | Marília de Dirceu | Soloists, SATB chorus and orchestra | Three acts and a prologue. Libretto by Isolde Helena Brans. About 90 minutes. The opera received the Nancy Van de Vate International Composition Prize for Opera in 2006. |
| 2011 | Anita Garibaldi | Soloists, narrator, SATB chorus and orchestra | Three acts and a prologue. Libretto by Fernandes. About 66 minutes. Fernandes's later works list gives the composition year as 2012. |
| 2017 | Leopoldina, a Imperatriz do Brasil | Opera in three acts | Libretto by Fernandes. About 65 minutes. |

=== Orchestral and large-ensemble works ===
| Year | Work | Scoring | Details |
|---|---|---|---|
| 1979 | Dawawa Tsawidi | Winds and percussion | Six sections. About 15 minutes. Premiered during the Latin American Composition Competition of the Música Nova Ensemble, conducted by Piero Bastianelli. It received the Government of the State of Bahia Prize. |
| 1982 | Wãnĩ A'Ama | Orchestra | Five sections. About 15 minutes. Premiered by the Brazilian Symphony Orchestra at the Sala Cecília Meireles in 1983, conducted by Roberto Ricardo Duarte. |
| 1984 | Tainahyky | Flute, oboe, clarinet, bassoon, horn, trumpet and percussion | About eight minutes. It received third prize in the first Heitor Villa-Lobos National Composition Competition and was premiered in Brasília in 1984 under Frederico Richter. |
| 1987 | Hékélaly (Bailado completo) | Orchestra | Two large sections. About 18 minutes. Premiered by the Brazilian Symphony Orchestra at the ninth Brazilian Contemporary Music Biennial in 1991, conducted by Ricardo Prado. The score incorporates Ritus (1984). |
| 1989 | A Travessia | Symphonic band | About ten minutes. Dedicated to the conductor Roberto Trench. |
| 1996 | Pau Brasil I | Orchestra | Three sections, Mantiqueira, Xingu and Pampas. About ten minutes. Premiered at the twelfth Brazilian Contemporary Music Biennial in 1997, conducted by Piero Bastianelli. |
| 2013 | Encantada (Piano Concertato) | Piano and orchestra | Three sections, Prelúdio (Aurora), Interlúdio (Crepúsculo) and Finale (Madrugada). About eleven minutes. |

=== Chamber music ===
| Year | Work | Scoring | Details |
|---|---|---|---|
| 1974 | Cantilena no. 1 | Flute and piano | About two minutes. Premiered in Campinas in 1974 by the flautist Valdilei Francisco de Assis. |
| 1974 | Cantilena no. 2 | Flute and cello | About two minutes. |
| 1977 | Territórios e ocas | String quartet, tambour, tam-tam and bells | About 15 minutes. Premiered at the Sala Cecília Meireles in 1979 by the String Quartet of the Brazilian Chamber Orchestra, conducted by Henrique Morelenbaum. It received second place in the 1979 Esso Classical Music Prize. |
| 1980 | Nakutnak | Violin and piano | Four sections. About ten minutes. Premiered at the Sala Funarte in 1981 by Aleida Schweitzer and Jerzy Milewski. It was a finalist in the first competition for works for violin and piano organized by Irmãos Vitale and INM-Funarte. |
| 1987 | Nakutnak | Flute, oboe, clarinet, horn and bassoon | Adaptation of the 1980 violin-and-piano work. About ten minutes. It received first place in the third Latin American Composition Competition in Montevideo in 1988. |
| 1989 | Palácio dos Guarantãs | Violin, viola and cello | Six sections. About 12 minutes. Premiered by Trio Rogulski at the Música Nova Festival in the São Paulo Museum of Art in 1990. |
| 1990 | Momentu I | Flute, two cellos, percussion and dancer | About ten minutes. The dancer's footsteps and other percussive gestures form part of the score. |
| 2001 | Dreams | Two guitars | Five movements. About ten minutes. Fernandes made a solo-guitar version in 2004. |

=== Piano works ===
| Year | Work | Scoring | Details |
|---|---|---|---|
| 1973 | Prelúdio | Piano | Recorded by Luciana Soares on the 2004 album Brasileira: Piano Music by Brazilian Women. |
| 1974 | Polca | Piano | Published by Irmãos Vitale in 1981. |
| 1974 | Sinhá Marreca | Piano | Published by Irmãos Vitale in 1981. |
| 1975 | Valsa | Piano | Recorded by Luciana Soares on the 2004 album Brasileira: Piano Music by Brazilian Women. |
| 1977 | Ciclo | Piano | Five sections. About ten minutes. Premiered by Nelson Neves at the Sala Funarte in 1979. It received second place and publication in the first Brazilian Competition of Classical Composition for Piano or Guitar. |
| 1983 | Ciclo no. 2 | Piano | Four movements, Da noite, Da madrugada, Do dia and Do crepúsculo. Premiered by Sônia Maria Vieira at the seventh Panorama da Música Brasileira Atual in 1984. Fernandes also prepared a version for organ. |
| 1984 | Ciclo no. 3 | Piano | Three movements. About ten minutes. Premiered by Ruth Serrão in Grand Rapids, Michigan, in 1984. |
| 2000 | Dualismo | Two pianos | About 15 minutes. Premiered by Sônia Maria Vieira and Maria Helena Andrade at the fourteenth Brazilian Contemporary Music Biennial in 2001. |
| 2004 | Vales | Piano | Three movements, Do amor, Da dor and Da paz. Premiered by Ruth Serrão at the Sala Cecília Meireles in 2009 and recorded by Sylvia Maltese that year. |
| 2007 | Vales II | Piano | Three movements, Da esperança, Da solidão and Da paixão. |

=== Vocal and choral works ===
| Year | Work | Scoring | Details |
|---|---|---|---|
| 1977 | Imagens | Narrator, SATB chorus and orchestra | About 14 minutes. Inspired by poetry by Cecília Meireles. |
| 1978 | Maráwawa | Narrator, vocal soloists, SATB chorus, flute, three horns and percussion | Text by Roberto Bicelli. Six sections. About 15 minutes. Premiered at the first Latin American Music Biennial at the Teatro Ibirapuera in São Paulo in 1978. |
| 1979 | Dapraba | Three-part children's chorus a cappella | Five Indigenous children's songs associated with the Xavante, Karajá and Tiriy peoples. About seven minutes. It shared first prize in the first Funarte National Composition Competition for Children's Chorus and was published in Funarte's Música Brasileira para Coro Infantil series. |
| 1986 | Natum Est | SATB chorus and orchestra | Oratorio in ten sections. About 15 minutes. |
| 1992 | Brasil 92 | Mezzo-soprano, flute, clarinet, piano and percussion | Three sections, Chapada dos Guimarães, Pantanal and Sangradouro. About eight minutes. Premiered at the tenth Brazilian Contemporary Music Biennial in 1993. |
| 1998 | Akauá-se (A descoberta) | SATB chorus with tenor and bass soloists | Three sections, Os donos da terra, O Monte Pascoal and Comunhão. About eight minutes. |
| 1998 | Pau Brasil II | Wordless soprano, winds, violin, piano and percussion | Second work in the Pau Brasil sequence. |
| 2000 | Pau Brasil III | SATB chorus and orchestra | Three sections, Caraça, Largo do Boticário and Pelourinho. Written with a Rioarte composition grant. |

== Discography ==
| Year | Release | Performers | Label and format | Music by Fernandes |
|---|---|---|---|---|
| 1984 | Ruth Serrão, piano | Ruth Serrão, piano | Funarte, MMB 84.036, LP | Ciclo. |
| 1984 | III Bienal de Música Brasileira Contemporânea 3 | Festival performers | Funarte, Projeto Memória Musical Brasileira, MMB 84.042, LP | Dawawa Tsawidi. |
| 1996 | Música brasileira para sopros e piano | Ensemble Rio | Rioarte Digital, RD 006, CD | Wind-quintet version of Nakutnak, printed as "Nakutanak" in the track listing. |
| 2000 | Nuove canzoni per il Natale | Ensemble Octandre and Musicattuale | CD | Comunhão, the third section of Akauá-se. |
| 2004 | Brasileira: Piano Music by Brazilian Women | Luciana Soares, piano | Centaur Records, CRC 2680, CD | Prelúdio and Valsa. |
| 2009 | Mulheres compositoras: França–Brasil / Femmes compositrices: France–Brésil | Sylvia Maltese, piano, and Duo Tarditi–Maltese | NovoDisc, CD | The three movements of Vales. |
| 2022 | Entre brumas e fúrias | Quarteto Boulanger | Digital album | The three movements of Celebração, O cântico das criaturas, As oferendas da Terra and Comunhão. |
