= Tiradentes =

18th-century Brazilian revolutionary and national hero

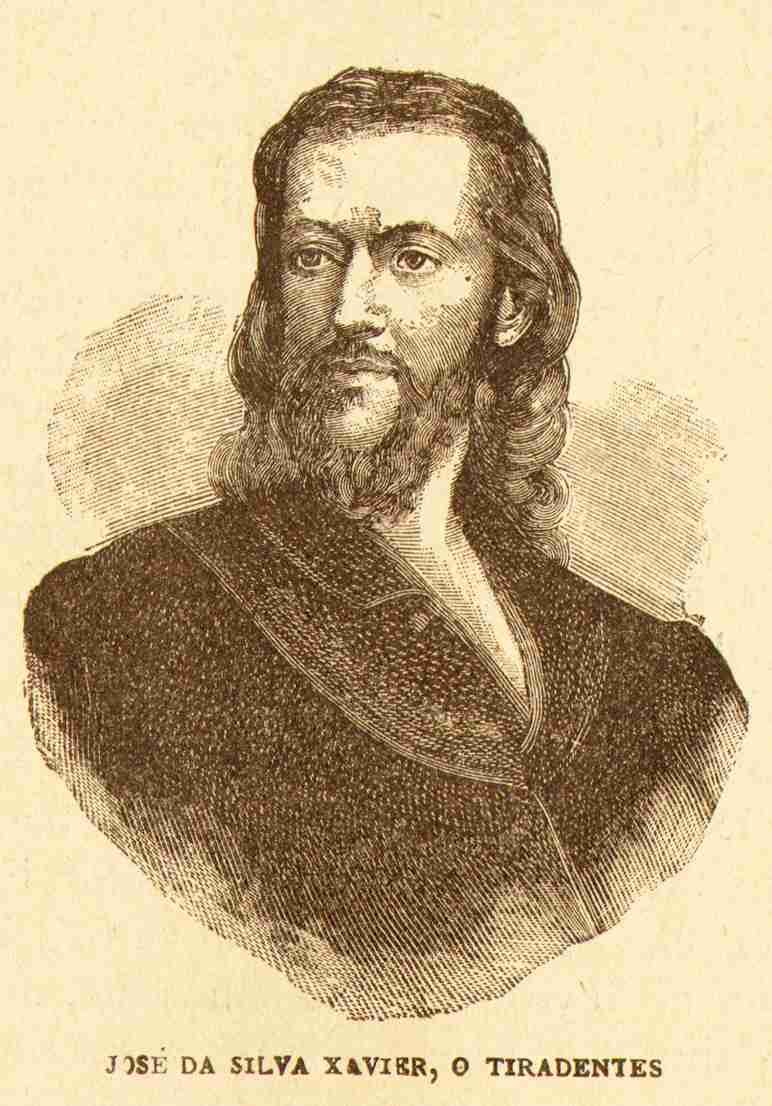
- Tiradentes by Alfredo Roque Gameiro (1899). No contemporary portraits or physical descriptions of Tiradentes are known
- Born: Joaquim José da Silva Xavier; 12 November 1746; Fazenda do Pombal (Ritápolis), Minas Gerais, Colonial Brazil (present-day Brazil)
- Died: 21 April 1792 (aged 45); Rio de Janeiro, Colonial Brazil (present-day Brazil)
- Cause of death: Execution by hanging
- Movement: Inconfidência Mineira (executed)

Joaquim José da Silva Xavier (Portuguese pronunciation: [ʒoa'kĩ ʒo'zɛ da 'siwvɐ ʃavi'ɛɾ]; 12 November 1746 – 21 April 1792), known as Tiradentes (pronounced [tʃiɾɐˈdẽtʃis]), was a leading member of the colonial Brazilian revolutionary movement known as the Inconfidência Mineira, whose aim was full independence from Portuguese rule and the creation of a republic. When the conspirators plot was uncovered by authorities, Tiradentes was arrested, tried and publicly hanged.

Since the advent of the Brazilian Republic, Tiradentes has been considered a national hero of Brazil and patron of the Military Police.

== Early life ==
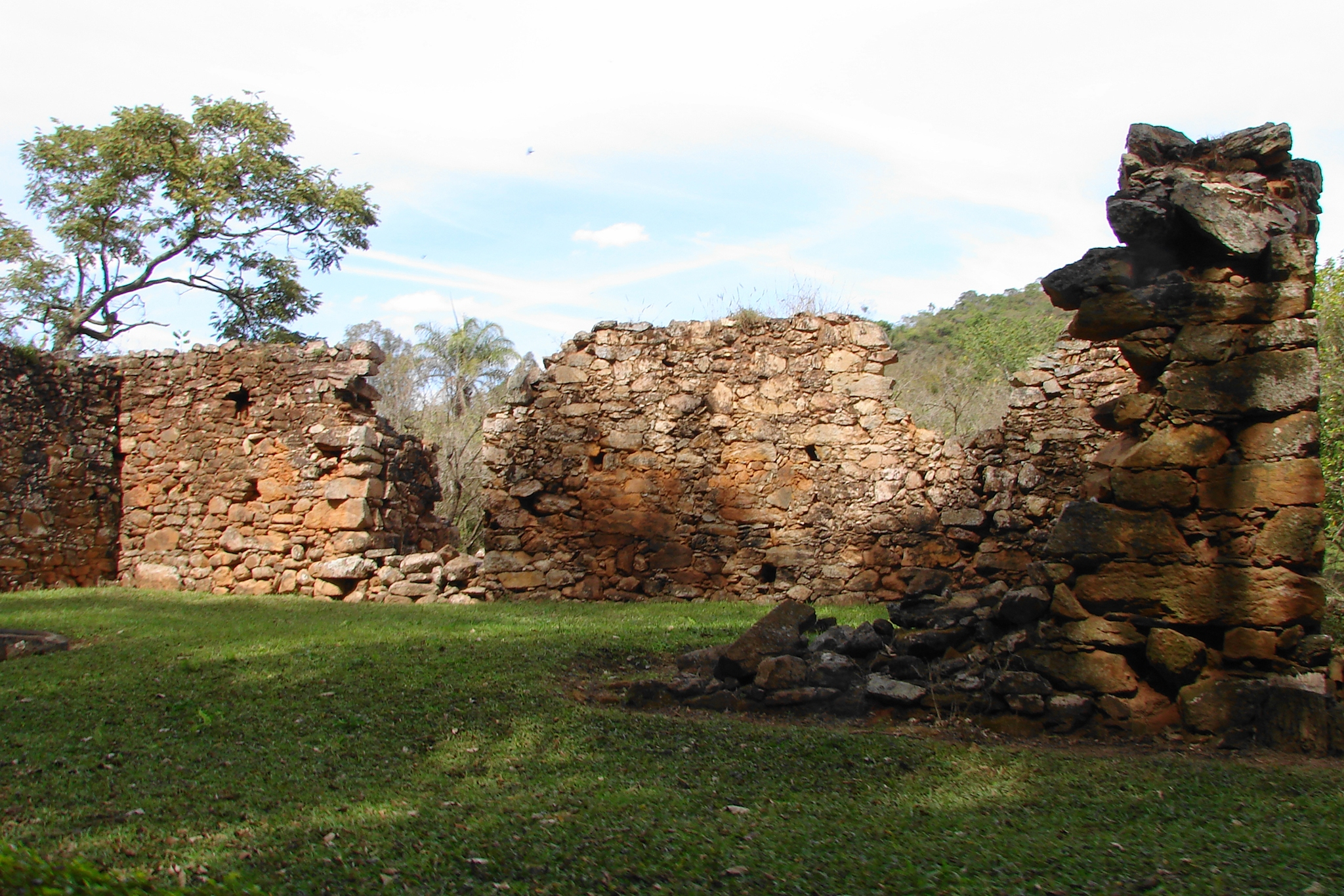
Ruins of the Fazenda do Pombal, in the present municipality of Ritápolis

Tiradentes was born on the Fazenda do Pombal, near the village of Santa Rita do Rio Abaixo, at the time disputed territory between the towns of São João del-Rei and Tiradentes, in the Captaincy of Minas Gerais in Colonial Brazil.

Joaquim José da Silva Xavier was the fourth of seven children of Portuguese-born Domingos da Silva Santos and of Brazilian-born Antônia da Encarnação Xavier.

According to his mother's 1757 inventory, there were 35 slaves on the family's large fazenda of Pombal, where they also worked as miners. A porch provided external access to an oratory, and there were slave quarters and communal kitchens. A large and valuable quantity of mining equipment was also listed in the inventory.

In 1755 after the death of his mother, he went with his father and brothers to the town of São José. Two years later, when he was 11 years old, his father died. With the premature death of his parents, his family soon lost its property due to debt. Having received no regular education, he entered under the tutelage of his uncle and godfather Sebastião Ferreira Leitão, who was a dentist. He worked as a peddler and a miner, and he became a partner in a pharmacy in Vila Rica. He dedicated himself to pharmaceutical practices and dentistry, which earned him the nickname Tiradentes. "Tiradentes" means "tooth puller", a pejorative denomination adopted during the trial against him. According to Brother Raimundo de Penaforte, Tiradentes "adorned his mouth with new teeth which he made himself that seemed natural". He also occasionally worked as a doctor in light of knowledge about medicinal plants acquired with his cousin, Brother José Mariano da Conceição Veloso, a celebrated botanist of the time.

== Political ideas ==
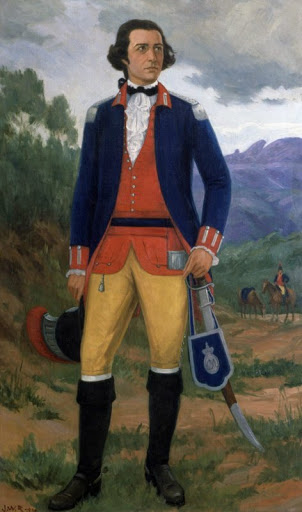
Tiradentes in uniform of alferes, by José Wasth Rodrigues (1940)

Tiradentes used knowledge he acquired about minerals while working as a miner to enter the public service as a terrain surveyor.

He later joined the Minas Gerais Dragoon Regiment, where he was given command of a detachment and sent on missions to cities along "Caminho Novo", a road between Vila Rica (then capital of Minas Gerais) and Rio de Janeiro through which gold was sent to the coast, ultimately to be shipped to Portugal.

Over time, witnessing the transit of goods along Caminho Novo, Tiradentes started to perceive the massive exportation of gold and other valuable resources to the metropolis as exploitation to which Brazilians were subjected. He also grew dissatisfied with his relatively low rank: not a member of the local aristocracy, he was systematically overlooked for promotion, never rising above alferes (the lowest officer rank at the time), and was eventually dismissed from his commanding post.

Flag of the Brazilian Republic, as proposed by the inconfidentes

His trips to Rio put him in contact with people who had lived in Europe and brought liberal ideas from there.

In 1788, Tiradentes met José Álvares Maciel, a son of Vila Rica's army's commandant who had just returned from England. Contrasting British industrial progress with Brazilian colonial poverty, the two decided to create a group of freedom aspirants. Led by clerics and other Brazilians with some social presence, like Cláudio Manuel da Costa, Tomás Antônio Gonzaga (both public servants and renowned writers) and Alvarenga Peixoto (eminent businessman), the group propagated their ideas among the people.

At the time, Portugal's demand for gold was high. However, productivity of Brazilian mines was declining. The colony was failing to meet the quinto – the quota of gold demanded by the Crown – and pressure from the metropolis rose. This culminated in the creation of the derrama, a heavily confiscatory tribute that, in turn, further stirred seditious sentiments.

Influenced by the writings of Jean-Jacques Rousseau and the American Revolution, Tiradentes joined a number of like-minded citizens in the Inconfidência Mineira, a revolutionary movement. They envisioned an independent Brazilian republic, with São João del Rei as its capital and the conversion of Vila Rica to a university town. The proposed flag for the new republic had a green triangle over a white background, surrounded by the Latin motto "Libertas Quae Sera Tamen" ("Freedom, Even If It Be Late").

The inconfidentes' flag later became the state flag of Minas Gerais, the only modification being the color of the triangle, changed to red

== Discovery, trial and execution ==
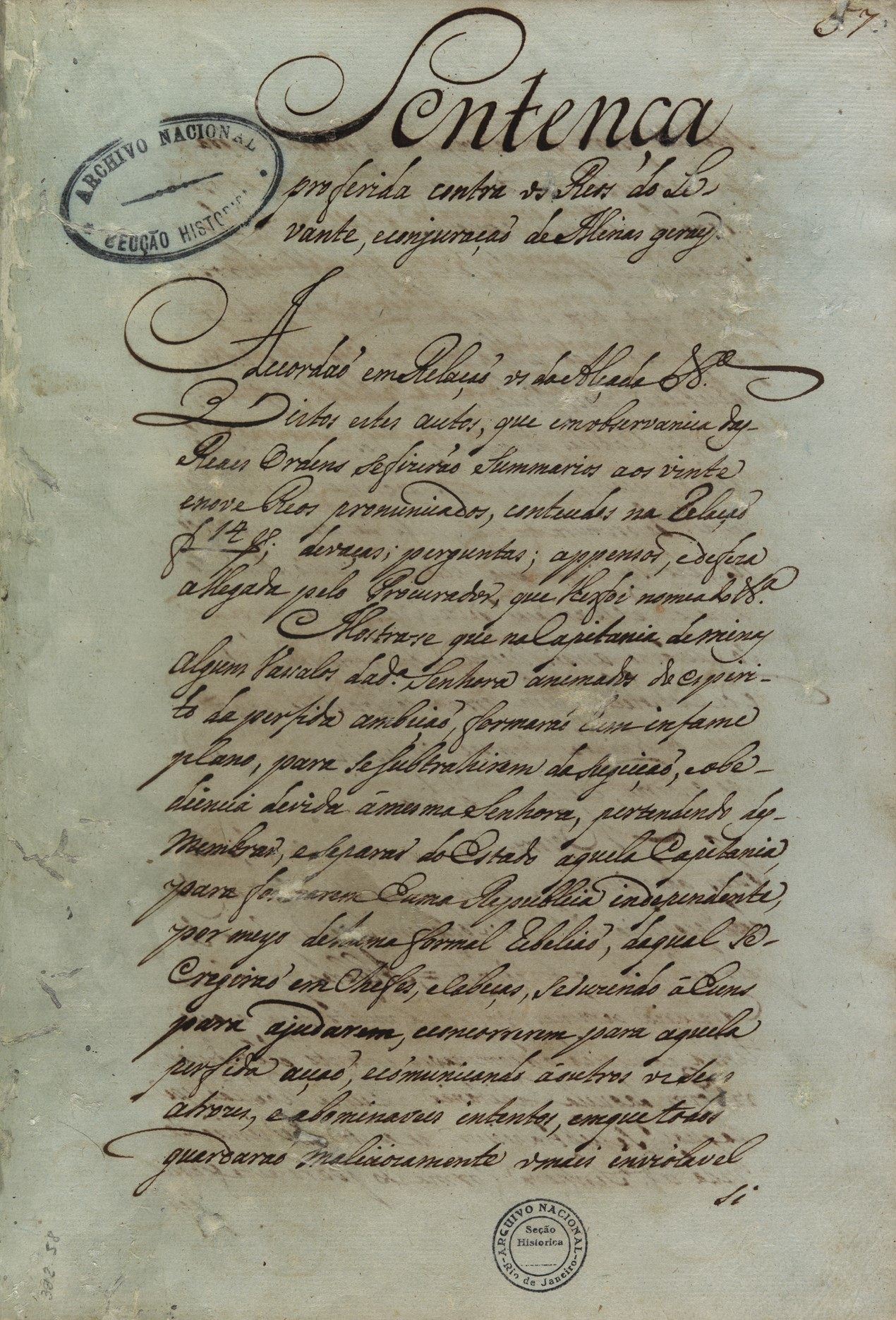
Sentence pronounced against Tiradentes, 1792

Tiradentes's plan was to take to the streets of Vila Rica and proclaim a Brazilian Republic on the day of the derrama, in February 1789, when tax was due to Portugal and the sentiment of revolt among Brazilians would be stronger. Joaquim Silvério dos Reis, one of the conspirators, exposed the plot in exchange for a tax waiver. The governor of Minas Gerais cancelled the derrama and ordered the imprisonment of the rebels.

A trial was carried, lasting almost three years. Tiradentes was sentenced to death, along with ten other inconfidentes. Queen Maria I of Portugal later commuted the sentences of capital punishment to perpetual banishment for all convicts, except those whose activities involved aggravated circumstances. Such was the case of Tiradentes, who took full responsibility for the movement.

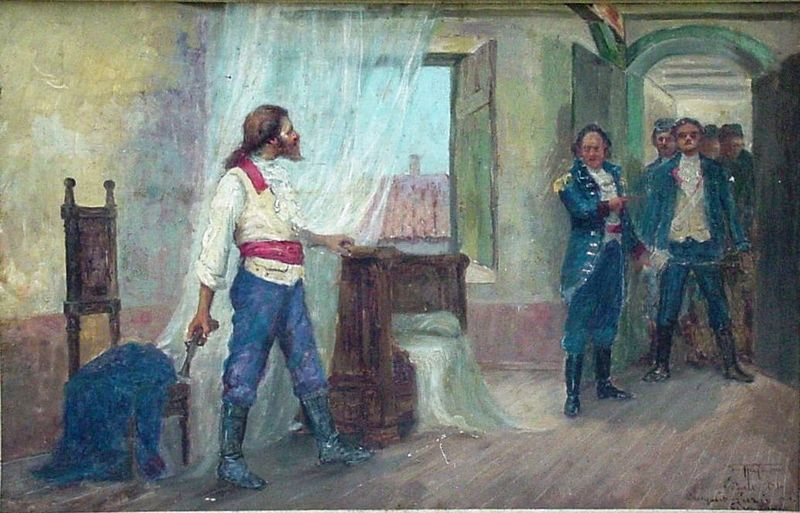
Prison of Tiradentes

He was imprisoned in Rio, then hanged on 21 April 1792. Afterwards, his body was quartered and the pieces were sent to Vila Rica, to be displayed in places where he used to propagate his liberal ideas. His head landed in Ouro Preto but was subsequently lost.

== National hero ==
Tiradentes began to be considered a national hero by the republicans in the late 19th century. After the institution of the Republic, in 1889, the anniversary of his death became a national holiday.

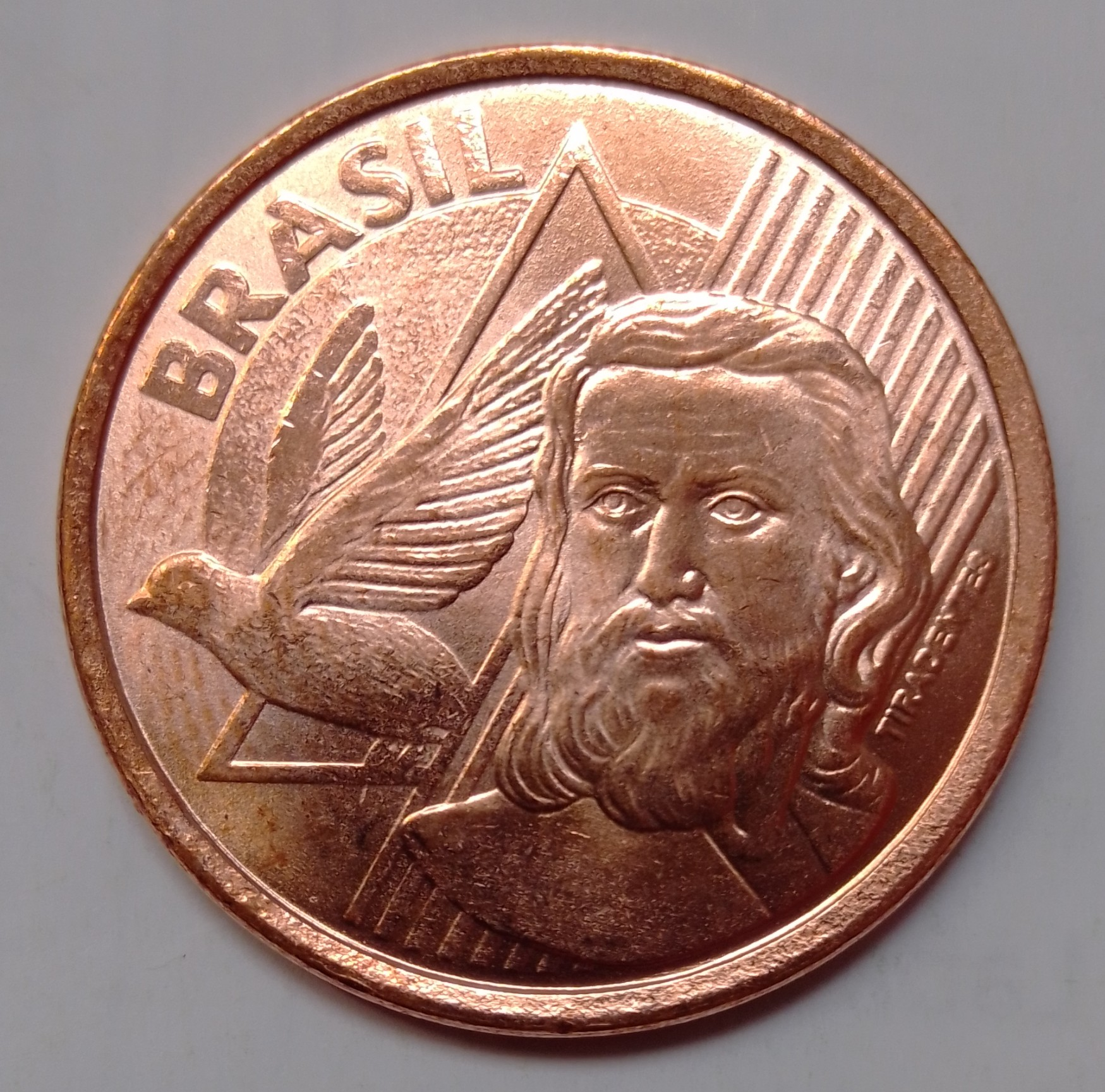
Tiradentes depicted on a 5 centavo coin

His moniker, "Tiradentes", became the namesake of a city in the state of Minas Gerais, of city squares in Belo Horizonte, Curitiba, São Paulo, Rio de Janeiro, and Ouro Preto, as well as of a major avenue in Santo Domingo, Dominican Republic.

The 11th Mountain Infantry Battalion, "Tiradentes" Regiment (11.º Batalhão de Infantaria de Montanha, Regimento "Tiradentes"), named after the hero, has been in operation in the Brazilian Army since 1888.

== See also ==
- Zica family, descendants of Tiradentes
- Toussaint Louverture
- Simón Bolívar
- George Washington
