= Joaquim Silvério dos Reis =

Brazilian conspirator

- Born: 1756; Monte Real, Leiria, Portugal
- Died: 12 or 17 February 1819 (aged 62–63); São Luís, United Kingdom of Portugal, Brazil and the Algarves

Joaquim Silvério dos Reis Montenegro Leiria Grutes (1756–1819) was a conspirator who betrayed the Inconfidência Mineira in exchange for having his taxes waived. He was the husband of Bernardina Quitéria de Oliveira Belo, who was a cousin of Francisco Antônio de Oliveira Lopes and aunt of Duque de Caxias and Conde de Tocantins.

== Biography ==
Joaquim Silvério dos Reis Montenegro Leiria Grutes was born in Monte Real, a parish in the Portuguese municipality of Leiria, in 1756. Being assigned to Brazil, he was a colonel in the cavalry division of the Minas Gerais province in Borda do Campo (today, Antonio Carlos). He was also a farmer and proprietor of several gold mines in the province of Minas Gerais, during a time where mining was its main economic activity.

He married Bernardina Quitéria de Oliveira Belo, cousin of Francisco Antonio de Oliveira Lopes and aunt to the Duke of Caxias and the Count of Tocantins.

== Inconfidência Mineira ==
In the early 18th century, the Portuguese crown began to institute a series of taxes and levies around all mining activity in its Brazilian colony. In 1702, the Stewardship for the Mines was created to fulfill that goal, being controlled directly from authorities in Lisboa. This new agency of the Royal Treasury called for the payment of the 'Quinto' ("Fifth"), or a fifth of the total amount gold extracted. Additional measures to enforce taxation were manifested in the creation of official foundry houses (Portuguese: Casas de Fundição), where the gold extracted received an official stamp required for commercial circulation. An annual quota for gold extraction was also implemented in order to guarantee a sufficient 'quinto': 1,500 kilograms of gold. When the captaincy of a mining community could not satisfy the royal demand for gold, it was burdened with an additional tax on gold, a process called derrama.

The derramas were made in a general climate of fear and violence. With the depletion of several gold mines, especially in Vila Rica (present day Ouro Preto), the local population lived in fear of an even more violent derrama, which in part triggered a group of "inconfidentes", conspirators against the Portuguese, to start planning a revolt in time for the derrama of 1789. Notable inconfidentes included Lt.-Colonel Francisco de Paula Freire de Andrade and the poets Cláudio Manuel da Costa, Tomás António Gonzaga, Alvarenga Peixoto and Joaquim José da Silva Xavier, who would later be best known as Tiradentes.

== Plea ==
Joaquim became aware of the inconfidentes' intent to revolt and wrote a plea letter on 11 April 1789, to the Governor of Minas Gerais, the Viscount of Barbacena, essentially alerting the colonial authorities to the existence of a movement in Vila Rica which intended to proclaim a Republic in Brazil and free it from Portugal. The derrama for that year was subsequently suspended and the main leaders of the revolt were arrested.

As compensation for his plea, Joaquim issued a series of demands: a prize in gold, to be forgiven of his fiscal debts, to be named Treasurer of the provinces of Minas Gerais, Goias and Rio de Janeiro, a private mansion, a lifetime pension, the title of Fidalgo, the honour and uniform of the Portuguese Military Order of Christ and a meeting in Lisboa with the Prince Regent Dom João. It is uncertain if any of these demands were met.

== Final years and death ==
Joaquim suffered a series of attempts on his life in Brazil after his plea, being seen as a traitor for making the plea deal. He escaped to Lisbon, only return to Brazil in 1808, to the province of Maranhão, where his wife had roots. He died there in February 1819.
