= José Carlos da Silva Mayrink Ferrão =

Brazilian politician

José Carlos Mayrink da Silva Ferrão
- Born: December 5, 1771
- Died: January 15, 1846 (aged 74)
- Occupations: Politician, Landowner
- Spouse: Maria Joana Maria de Deus Gomes (m. ?)
- Parent(s): Captain Baltazar João Mayrink (father), Maria Dorotéia Joaquina de Seixas (mother)
- Awards: Knight of the Imperial Order of Christ

José Carlos Mayrink da Silva Ferrão (December 5, 1771 – January 15, 1846) was a Brazilian politician and landowner. Son of Captain Baltazar João Mayrink and Maria Dorotéia Joaquina de Seixas, was also brother of Maria Dorotéia Joaquina de Seixas Brandão, also known as "Marilia de Dirceu". He adopted the name of Silva Ferrão family.

== Biography ==
In Rio de Janeiro, where he was studying, he met Caetano Pinto de Miranda Montenegro, appointed Governor of Mato Grosso, for whom he became secretary. When Montenegro was transferred to Pernambuco, in 1804, José Carlos accompanied him, and became secretary of the new governor. He remained in that position until the deposition of the governor in 1817. Wrapped in Pernambuco Revolution of 1817, he had to flee and went into exile in Paris. Returning to Recife, sometime after, with the Empire, he was appointed the First President of the Province of Pernambuco (appointed on April 25, 1824, took over on May 23, 1824), until April 14, 1826, when he traveled to the imperial court (the city of Rio de Janeiro) to take lifetime job then senator of the Empire of Brazil, from 1826 to 1846. He reassumed the position of president of the province, returning to manage it in 1827 (appointed on January 20, 1827, took over on October 25, 1827) until December 29, 1828. He transferred the capital of Pernambuco, Olinda to Recife. Again, he was third President of Pernambuco (from October 30, 1827 to December 24, 1828).

In addition to being a Senator of the Brazilian Empire, he was also Colonel of Militia of Cavalry of Cape and, National Guard Colonel. He was also a Knight of the Imperial Order of Christ.

He has left progeny, through which flows the name Seixas Ferrão, from his marriage to Maria Joana Maria de Deus Gomes (1776, Recife, PE – August 10, 1866, Recife, PE), daughter of João Antônio Gomes, head of family Gomes from Pernambuco and, maternal granddaughter of Domingos Pereira Pires, patriarch of family Pires Pereira from Pernambuco.
