= Zica family =

The Zica family is a historic Brazilian family, originating in Minas Gerais in the late 18th century.

== History ==
After the death of Tiradentes, Mary I of Portugal ordered the murder of all his wives and sons. Tiradentes had 8 sons, with 8 different wives. Tiradentes's wives, afraid for their lives and the lives of their children, changed their surnames. One of his wives changed her surname to Zica. It is believed that the other sons never had children, meaning that the only descendants of Tiradentes are the members of the Zica family. The Zica family has grown since then, and owns many farms with a net worth of over a billion reals.

Today the government of Brazil pays indemnities to many members of the Zica family.

== See also ==
- Tiradentes
- Inconfidência Mineira
- Minas Gerais
- Mary I of Portugal
