= Alvarenga Peixoto =

- Born: Inácio José de Alvarenga Peixoto; 1744; Rio de Janeiro, Brazil
- Died: 1793 (aged 48–49); Ambaca, Angola
- Education: University of Coimbra
- Occupations: Poet, lawyer
- Spouse: Bárbara Heliodora
- Children: Maria Ifigênia, José Eleutério, Tristão Antônio, João Damasceno
- Writing career
- Pen name: Eureste Fenício
- Literary movement: Neoclassicism

Inácio José de Alvarenga Peixoto (1744–1793) was a Colonial Brazilian Neoclassic poet and lawyer. He wrote under the pen name Eureste Fenício.

The design of the flag of Minas Gerais is attributed to him.

== Biography ==
Peixoto was born in Rio de Janeiro, to Simão Alvarenga Braga and Maria Braga. He studied at the Jesuit College in Rio and would later graduate in Law at the University of Coimbra, where he met and befriended Basílio da Gama, another Brazilian poet.

After he graduated, he served as juiz-de-fora in Sintra. Returning to Brazil, he was senator of the city of São João del Rei and the ouvidor of the Comarca of Rio das Mortes.

Due to overdue taxes, Peixoto would adhere to the unsuccessful 1789 Minas Conspiracy, alongside the poets Tomás António Gonzaga and Cláudio Manuel da Costa, the priest José da Silva e Oliveira Rolim and the alférez Joaquim José da Silva Xavier (a.k.a. "Tiradentes").

Joaquim Silvério dos Reis, a member of the Conspiracy, betrayed the movement before it could take place. Peixoto was then captured, arrested and sent to exile in Ambaca, Angola, where he died.

Peixoto was married to poet Bárbara Heliodora (1758–1819), having with her four children. It is said that, after Peixoto was exiled, Heliodora's mental health began to gradually decline to the point of dementia.
