= Bárbara Heliodora =

Bárbara Heliodora may refer to:

- Bárbara Heliodora (poet) (c.1759–1819), Brazilian poet, gold miner and political activist
- Bárbara Heliodora (theatre critic) (1923–2015), Brazilian theatre critic, writer and translator
