= Brasópolis =

- Municipality
- Municipality of Brasópolis
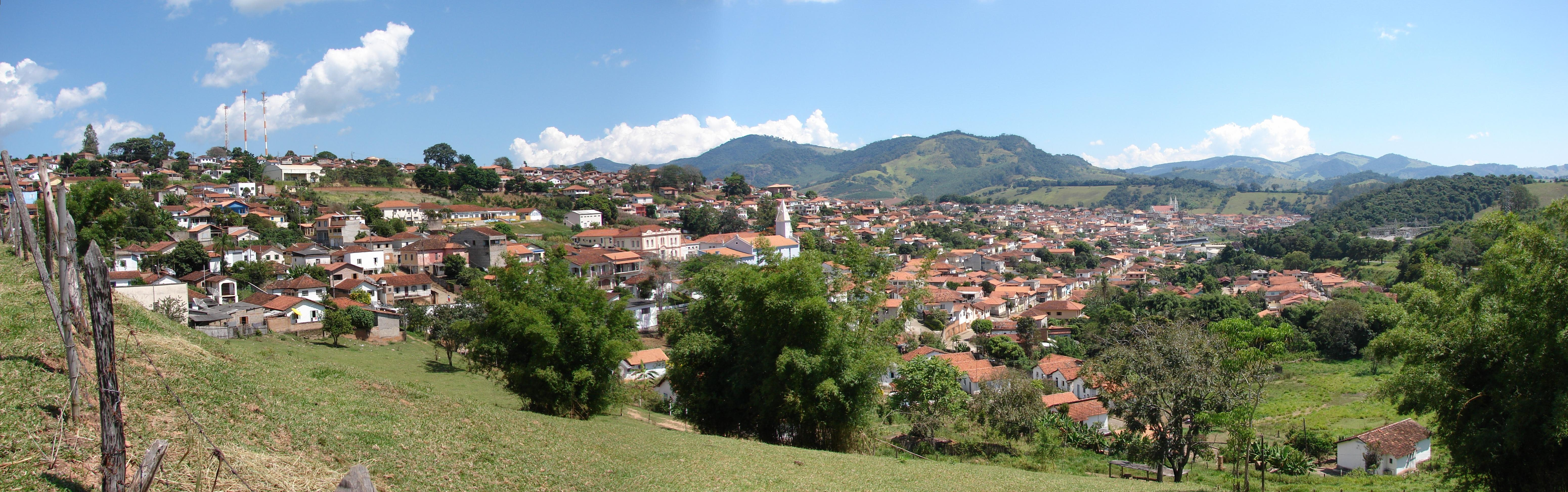

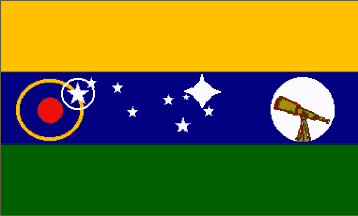
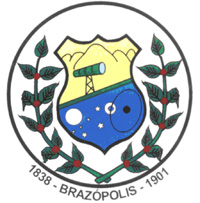
- Flag Coat of arms

- Location in the State of Minas Gerais
- Coordinates: 22°28′26″S 45°36′28″W
- Country: Brazil
- Region: Southeast
- State: Minas Gerais
- Founded: September 16, 1901

Area
  - Total: 361.160 km^{2} (139.445 sq mi)
- Elevation: 850 m (2,790 ft)

Population (2020)
  - Total: 14,410
  - Density: 39.8/km^{2} (103/sq mi)
- Time zone: UTC−3 (BRT)
- Postal Code: 37530-000
- HDI (2010): 0.692 – medium

Brasópolis is a municipality in Minas Gerais, Brazil. Previously called São Caetano da Vargem Grande, it was renamed after its most famous son, Venceslau Brás, ninth President of the Republic, although he was born in neighbouring Itajubá.

The municipality contains part of the 180,373 hectares (445,710 acres) Fernão Dias Environmental Protection Area, created in 1997.

== Notable people ==
- Venceslau Brás, former President of Brazil.
- Debinha (born 1991), footballer for Kansas City Current in the NWSL and the Brazil national team.
- Pablo Maia, football player.
- Maria Helena Rosas Fernandes, composer, pianist and conductor.

== See also ==
- List of municipalities in Minas Gerais
