= Maria Doroteia Joaquina de Seixas Brandão =

Brazilian historical figure (1767-1853)

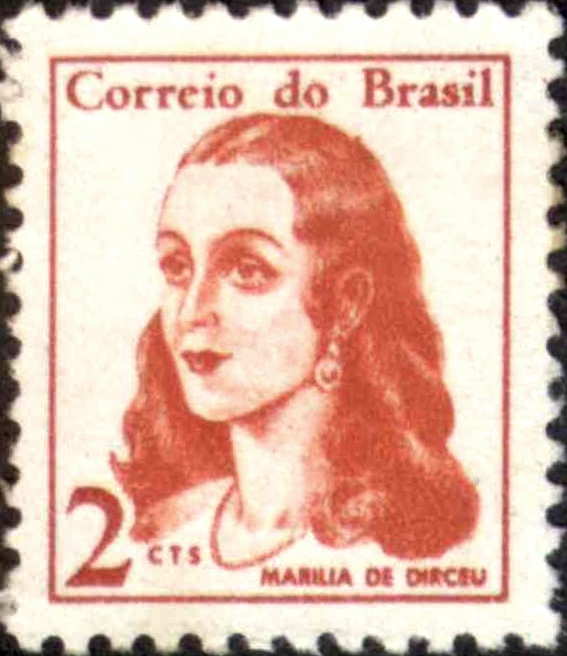
Marília de Dirceu 1967 Brazil stamp

Maria Doroteia Joaquina de Seixas Brandão (1767–1853), also called Marília, was a Brazilian heroine. She is famous for her participation in the failed Inconfidência Mineira for Brazilian independence from Portugal in 1789. She is also known for her engagement to Neoclassical poet Tomás António Gonzaga and his Marília de Dirceu, in which he immortalized her as the object of his love.

While Gonzaga extolled Marília's physical beauty at length, her younger first cousin, the poet Beatriz Francisca de Assis Brandão, tells us Marília was also a lively, quick-witted, and well-spoken person who tended toward sarcasm.

She has been the subject of a TV series and a film and have been featured on a stamp.
