= Acclamation of Amador Bueno =

Nativist movement

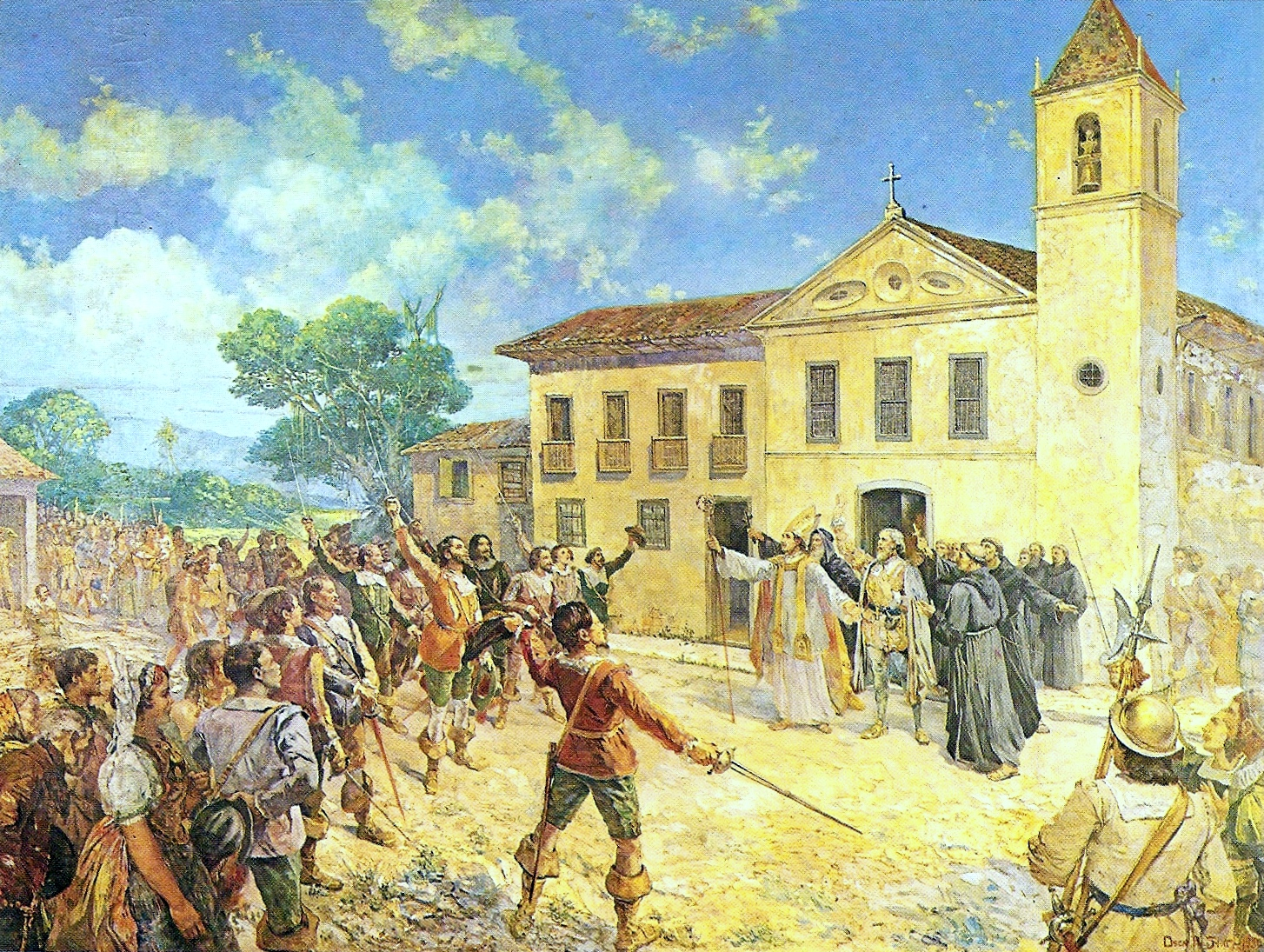
- Acclamation of Amador Bueno (1909), oil painting by Oscar Pereira da Silva.
- Date: 1641
- Location: São Paulo dos Campos de Piratininga
- Participants: Amador Bueno (denied)
- Outcome: Failed revolt

The acclamation of Amador Bueno (Portuguese: Aclamação de Amador Bueno), was an abortive revolt orchestrated primarily by Spanish colonists in São Paulo dos Campos de Piratininga in 1641, shortly after the royal acclamation of John IV. It is considered the first nativist movement or the first gesture of autonomy in Colonial Brazil and, not coincidentally, took place in São Paulo, which at the time had limited contact with Portugal and extensive miscegenation between Portuguese, indigenous peoples, and foreigners.

== Background ==
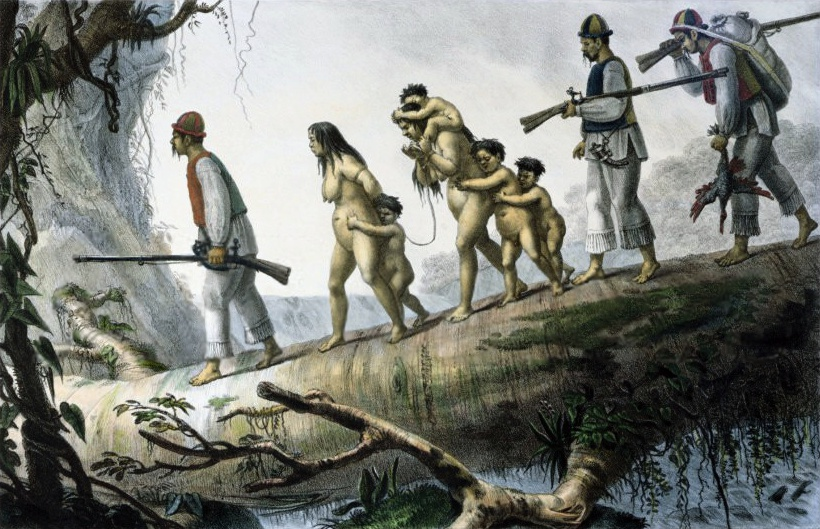
Indigenous slavery, which grew during the Iberian Union, was threatened in 1640.

During the Iberian Union, the inhabitants of the Captaincy of São Vicente, mainly from São Paulo dos Campos de Piratininga, were able to expand into Hispanic America (in accordance with the Treaty of Tordesillas) the territory of free action of the capture expeditions, which even attacked Jesuit missions. During this period, trade and smuggling with the Río de la Plata region also flourished.

In December 1640, with the coronation of Dom João, Duke of Bragança, which marked the Restoration of Portuguese Independence, the colonists feared that Portugal would destroy this source of wealth, preventing the free transit of goods and prohibiting the imprisonment and sale of indigenous people captured in raids in the hinterland, since it was Portugal that profited from the exploitation of African human trafficking. The acclamation of the Duke of Bragança as the new king of Portugal and his new policy represented a potential blow to the merchants of the colony and the Castilians who had long been established in São Paulo, whose economy was then based on indigenous slave labor.

== The revolt ==
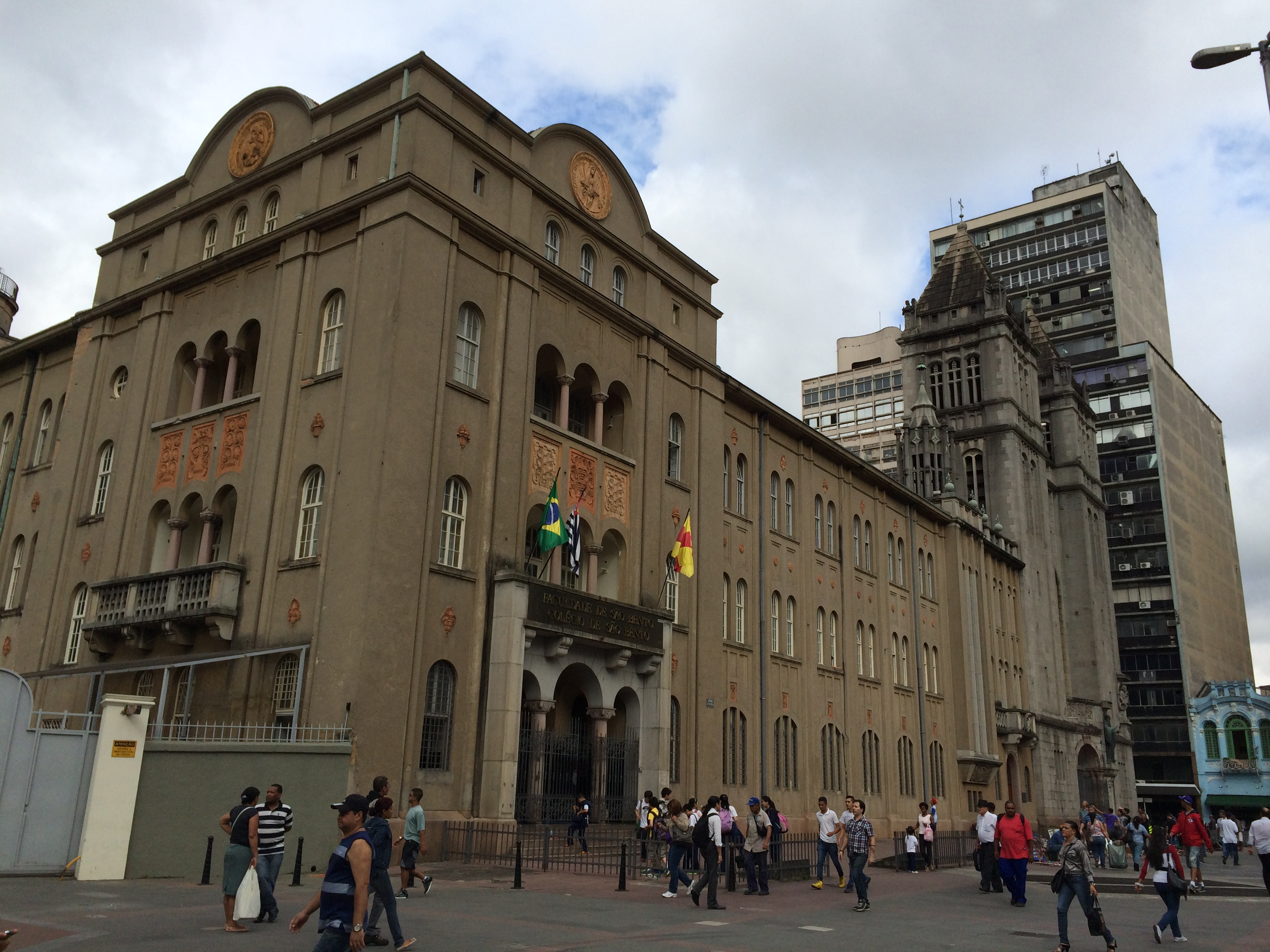
Monastery of São Bento, where Amador Bueno took refuge after rejecting the proposal of acclamation.

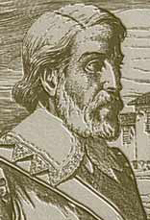
Amador Bueno.

Wanting to maintain the city's autonomy, some local elites proposed choosing a local king, convincing other potential rebels that they could refuse to recognize the new Portuguese king, since they had not yet sworn allegiance to him, and that those based in the colony had personal qualities that qualified them for greater empires, and that the city's advantageous location and their control over thousands of indigenous people would keep them safe.

They chose Amador Bueno da Ribeira (who probably lived between 1584 and 1649) as king, the son of a Spanish father from Seville and Maria, a Brazilian woman whose father was from Porto and whose mother was Tupi-Portuguese. Amador was a prosperous local figure, a landowner, Captain-General, and Ombudsman.

Amador Bueno, who had personal connections to both Spanish and Portuguese nobility, according to Gaspar da Madre de Deus, countered his acclamation by saying "long live Lord João IV, our King and Lord," and it is certain that he rejected the proposal, fearing its consequences. However, after intense negotiations, the Castilians and supporters of the proposal were assured that their businesses would not be affected by Portugal, and so they declared and swore allegiance to King John IV.

== Outcome ==
The gesture ended up having no serious consequences, as São Paulo was an economically marginalized region and the Castilians were unable to start a fight against Portugal without support from Madrid. The historical episode served, however, to demonstrate the discontent of certain groups in São Paulo with Portuguese domination.

== Sources ==
There are few sources relating to the episode. The main known account is that of Friar Gaspar da Madre de Deus, "Memórias para a História da Capitania de São Vicente" (Memoirs for the History of the Captaincy of São Vicente). For Monteiro, the indigenous issue was the basic motive for the movement's actions. However, other historians have a different interpretation. Afonso d'Escragnolle Taunay, in Ensaios Paulistas, says on page 631:

When John IV of Bragança assumed the throne of Portugal in 1640, Amador was acclaimed king in São Paulo the following year by the powerful party of influential and wealthy Castilians, led by the Rendon de Quevedo brothers, Juan and Francisco Rendón de Quevedo y Luna, natives of Coria, a party to which also belonged D. Francisco de Lemos, from the city of Orens; Gabriel Ponce de León, from Guaira; D. Bartolomeu de Torales, from Vila Rica do Paraguai; D. André de Zúñega and his brother D. Bartolomeu de Contreras y Torales; D. João de Espíndola e Gusmão, from the province of Paraguay; and others who signed the acclamation on 1 April 1641. As the Spaniards did not want to be subjects of D. John IV, whom they considered a rebellious vassal to his sovereign, they decided to provoke the secession of the São Paulo region from the rest of Brazil, perhaps hoping to annex it to the neighboring Spanish colonies. (...) They offered the throne to his father-in-law, himself the son of a Spaniard and a man of the highest standing in his republic due to his intelligence, fortune, past as a bandeirante, marriage, and positions held.

== Bibliography ==
- Bastos, Pedro Ivo de Assis (1984). História do Brasil (in Portuguese). São Paulo: Editora Moderna.
- Holanda, Sérgio Buarque de (1936). Raízes do Brasil (in Portuguese). Rio de Janeiro: José Olympio.
- Madre de Deus, Frei Gaspar da (1975). Memórias para a História da Capitania de São Vicente (in Portuguese). São Paulo/Belo Horizonte: EDUSP/Itatiaia.
- Monteiro, Rodrigo Bentes (1999). "A rochela do Brasil: São Paulo e a aclamação de Amador Bueno como espelho da realeza portuguesa". Revista de História (in Portuguese) (141). São Paulo: 21–44. doi:10.11606/issn.2316-9141.v0i141p21-44. ISSN 2316-9141.
- Monteiro, John Manuel (1995). Negros da Terra (in Portuguese). São Paulo: Cia. das Letras.
- Taunay, Afonso d'Escragnolle (1958). O Epos bandeirante e São Paulo Vila e Cidade. Ensaios Paulistas (in Portuguese). São Paulo: Editoria Anhembi.
- Veiga, Edison (2021). "Aclamação de Amador Bueno: como São Paulo quase teve um rei em 1641". TAB (in Portuguese). UOL.
