= Amador Bueno =

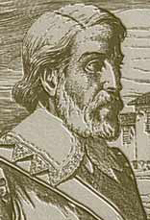
- Born: 1630
- Died: 1685 (aged 54–55)
- Occupations: Landowner; colonial administrator

Amador Bueno (c. 1584 – c. 1649) was a landowner and colonial administrator of the Captaincy of São Vicente (Colonial Brazil). Became an important figure in history when he was acclaimed king of the Paulistas in 1641, an event that represents the first separatist movement in Brazil.

== History ==
Bueno was born around 1584 in the city of São Paulo, Captaincy of São Vicente which is now the State of São Paulo in Brazil. He was born to Bartolomeu Bueno da Ribeira, a Galician settler from Ourense and Maria Pires, from São Paulo, daughter of Salvador Pires and Mécia Fernandes. Amador held several public office posts through royal appointment and elections.

Since 1580, the Kingdom of Portugal was in a dynastic union with the Kingdom of Spain, up until 1640, when the Portuguese acclaimed John IV of Portugal as the new king. A largely Spanish contingent in São Paulo tried to break away from both in 1641. Without Bueno's consent, they claimed him to be their king. Bueno finally dissuaded the group and urged loyalty to John IV.

Unrest among the citizens of São Paulo caused that Bueno had to seek sanctuary in the convent of Saint Bento. It is said he tried to reason with the crowds outside the convent from one of the porticos, but they would not return to their homes until the fathers of the convent went out and addressed the multitudes. They would later support the new King of Portugal and keep the unity of the colony of Brazil. It is not known exactly when he died but estimates are between 1646 and 1650.

Amador Bueno left many descendants, some of the most famous include: Carlos Drummond de Andrade, Walter Moreira Salles, Barbara Heliodora, Getúlio Vargas, Tancredo Neves, and Roberto Marinho, among many others.

According to Albert F. Kunze, who was cited in the 1941 booklet by Rogelio E. Alfaro entitled "Who's Who on the Postage Stamps of Brazil" with a foreword by the then Ambassador of Brazil to the US, Carlos Martins for the Pan American Union, Washington D.C. 1941. Pg.4
