= Cartas Chilenas =

Unfinished poetry series by Tomás António Gonzaga

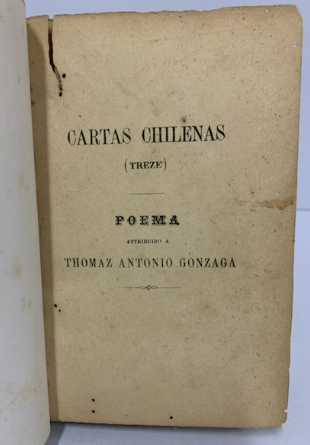
- Frontispiece of the first edition, 1863
- Author: Tomás António Gonzaga
- Language: Portuguese
- Subject: Satire
- Genre: Poetry, epistolary novel
- Publication date: 1863
- Publication place: Brazil

Cartas Chilenas (in English: Chilean Letters) is an unfinished series of satirical poems attributed to Luso-Brazilian Neoclassic poet Tomás António Gonzaga. The poems circulated in the city of Vila Rica (present-day Ouro Preto) via pamphlets for several years before the 1789 Minas Conspiracy, but were discontinued after the Conspiracy was dismantled, as Gonzaga was exiled to the Island of Mozambique. It is speculated that the Cartas Chilenas were inspired by Montesquieu's Persian Letters.

The poems were first compiled and published in 1863. They were re-edited several times thereafter, reaching their present form in 1957, thanks to the extensive research of Portuguese philologist Manuel Rodrigues Lapa.

== Plot and setting ==
Cartas Chilenas is a satirical poem in the shape of an epistolary novel, indirectly written "in honor" of Luís da Cunha Meneses, then-governor of the Captaincy of Minas Gerais, and the Portuguese Crown. It begins with a fictional foreword, in which an anonymous Brazilian man explains how the book came into being: he obtained a copy of a series of letters from a man coming to Brazil from an unnamed Hispanic America country, and decided to translate these letters from Spanish to Portuguese to prevent Brazilian governors from making the same mistakes as Fanfarrão Minésio, the tyrannical governor of Chile.

The thirteen letters were written as blank verse poems by "Critilo" (the assumed nom de plume of Tomás António Gonzaga), who lives in Santiago, Chile (actually Vila Rica, Minas Gerais), and are addressed to his friend, "Doroteu" (possibly Cláudio Manuel da Costa), who lives in Madrid. In each letter, "Critilo" describes life in Santiago under the despotic and corrupt régime of the Chilean governor, "Fanfarrão Minésio" (who is actually Luís da Cunha Meneses).
