= Bárbara Heliodora (poet) =

Brazilian poet (1759–1819)

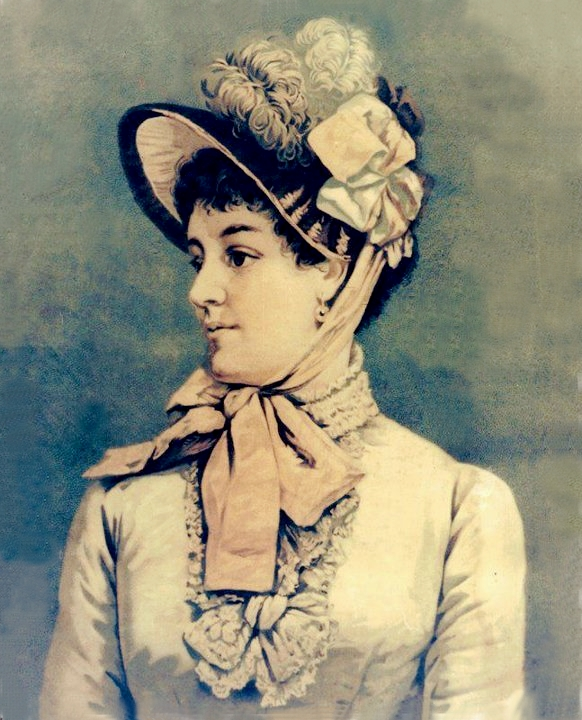

Bárbara Heliodora Guilhiermina da Silveira (December 3, 1759 – May 24, 1819) was a Brazilian poet, gold miner and political activist.

== Life ==
Bárbara Heliodora Guilhiermina da Silveira was born in São João del-Rei on December 3, 1759. Her parents were José da Silveira e Sousa and Maria Josefa Bueno da Cunha. For some scholars, she was descended from the family of Amador Bueno.

Heliodora was married to an Inconfidente, Alvarenga Peixoto. Heliodora and Peixoto lived together for some time before their wedding, only married by the ordinance of the Bishop of Mariana, on December 22, 1781. Maria Iphigenia, the couple's daughter, was already three years old. Three more children were born from their union: Jose Eleuterio, Joao Damasceno (who would later be called Joao Evangelista) and Tristao Antônio.

By virtue of her marriage to Alvarenga, and her participation in the Inconfidente movement, Heliodora won the title of "Heroine of Inconfidência of Minas Gerais". Her eldest daughter, Maria Ifigênia, died at age 13 follow a violent horse fall on the return journey from Campanha da Princesa to São Gonçalo do Sapucaí.

Heliodora died in São Gonçalo do Sapucaí on May 24, 1819.
