= Public holidays in Brazil =

In Brazil, public holidays may be legislated at the federal, statewide and municipal levels. Most holidays are observed nationwide.

Apart from the yearly official holidays (listed below), the Constitution of Brazil also establishes that election days are to be considered national holidays as well. General elections are biennially held on the first Sunday of October in the first round, and on the last Sunday of October in the second round. Numerous religious and ethnic holidays are also celebrated in Brazil.

| Date | English name | Portuguese name | Remarks |
|---|---|---|---|
| January 1 | New Year's Day | Ano Novo | Celebrates the beginning of the year. Festivities include counting down to midnight starting from the preceding night. It also signals the traditional end of the holiday season. |
| April 21 | Tiradentes Day | Dia de Tiradentes | Anniversary of the death of Tiradentes (1792), considered the national martyr for being part of the Inconfidência Mineira, an insurgent movement that aimed to establish an independent Brazilian republic. |
| May 1 | Labour Day | Dia do Trabalho | Celebrates the achievements of workers and the labour movement. |
| September 7 | Independence Day | Dia da Independência | Celebrates Brazil's declaration of independence from Portugal on September 7, 1822. |
| October 12 | Our Lady of Aparecida | Nossa Senhora Aparecida | Commemorates the Virgin Mary as Nossa Senhora da Conceição Aparecida, patron saint of Brazil. |
| November 2 | All Souls' Day | Dia de Finados | Christian holiday; it commemorates the faithful departed. |
| November 15 | Republic Day | Proclamação da República | Commemorates the end of the Empire of Brazil and the proclamation of the Brazilian Republic on November 15, 1889. |
| November 20 | Black Consciousness Day | Dia da Consciência Negra | Celebrates the Black Consciousness Day in honor of Zumbi dos Palmares, born this day (year is uncertain). |
| December 25 | Christmas Day | Natal | Celebrates the nativity of Jesus. |

== Secondary holidays ==
- Fat Tuesday, The day of Carnival.
- Ash Wednesday Wednesday after Carnival, the last Carnival day.
- Good Friday, the Friday preceding Easter Sunday, is a municipal holiday in many places.
- Corpus Christi is celebrated on the Thursday, 60 days after Easter Sunday.
- Dia dos Namorados, the Brazilian equivalent of Valentine's Day, is observed on June 12. On this day, boyfriends and girlfriends, husbands and wives, exchange gifts, cards, or a flower bouquet. It is celebrated on the eve of St. Anthony of Padua's day, because, in Brazil, he is considered the patron of those who wants a loving companion.
- Festas Juninas, the Catholic feasts of Santo Antônio, São João and São Pedro are celebrated June 13, 24, and 29 respectively in many Brazilian cities, especially in the Northeast region.
- Dia das Mães, the Brazilian observation of Mother's Day, is celebrated every second Sunday in May.
- Dia dos Pais, the Brazilian observation of Father's Day, is celebrated every second Sunday in August.
- Dia das Crianças, the Brazilian Children's Day, is celebrated on October 12, coinciding with the Our Lady of Aparecida.

== Regional holidays ==
Federal law gives each state the right to create one state holiday, and each municipality to create up to four municipal holidays. Some of the more notable ones are:

- January 12: Founding of Belém, City of Belém only.
- January 20: Saint Sebastian (São Sebastião), City of Rio de Janeiro only.
- January 22: Founding of the first city in Brazil, São Vicente. City of São Vicente only.
- January 25: Founding of São Paulo (Aniversário de São Paulo) and São Paulo FC, City of São Paulo only.
- January 26: Founding of Santos (Aniversario de Santos), City of Santos only.
- March 6: Pernambucan revolt, State of Pernambuco only.
- March 12: Founding of Recife and Olinda (Aniversário de Recife e Olinda), Cities of Recife and Olinda only.
- April 14: Founding of Santos FC, city of Santos only.
- April 21: Founding of Brasília (Aniversário de Brasília), coinciding with Tiradentes, Federal District only.
- April 23: Saint George (São Jorge), City of Rio de Janeiro only. In 2007, governor Sérgio Cabral Filho expanded this holiday to all the State of Rio de Janeiro.
- May 13: Our Lady of Fátima (Nossa Senhora do Rosário de Fátima) and foundation of Sport Club do Recife (Fundação do Sport Club do Recife), City of Recife only.
- July 2: Bahia Independence Day, State of Bahia only.
- July 8: Sergipe Political Emancipation Day, State of Sergipe only
- July 9: Constitutionalist Revolution (Revolução Constitucionalista), State of São Paulo only.
- August 15: Our Lady of the Good Voyage (Nossa Senhora da Boa Viagem), City of Belo Horizonte only.
- August 26:
  - Emancipation of the city of Campo Grande, City of Campo Grande only.
  - Founding of SE Palmeiras, City of São Paulo only.
- September 1: Founding of Sport Club Corinthians Paulista (Fundação do Sport Club Corinthians Paulista), City of São Paulo only.
- September 8: Our Lady of the Light in the Pine (Nossa Senhora da Luz dos Pinhais), City of Curitiba only.
- September 20: Farroupilha's Revolution (Revolução Farroupilha), State of Rio Grande do Sul only.
- October 11: Creation of the State of Mato Grosso do Sul, separated from Mato Grosso in 1977, State of Mato Grosso do Sul only.
- October 3: Uruaçú and Cunhaú Martyrs Day, State of Rio Grande do Norte only.
- October 24: Founding of Goiânia, City of Goiânia only.
- November 4: Founding of São Carlos, City of São Carlos only.
- November 21: Our Lady of Apresentação (Nossa Senhora da Apresentação) Day, City of Natal only.
- November 30: Evangelical Day (Dia do Evangélico), Federal District only.
- December 8: Our Lady of Conceição (Dia de Nossa Senhora da Conceição), State of Pernambuco, City of Belo Horizonte, City of Dourados, and Cities of Santa Maria and São Leopoldo only.
- December 19: Emancipation of the Province of Paraná, State of Paraná only.
