= Delfina Benigna da Cunha =

Brazilian poet (1791–1857)

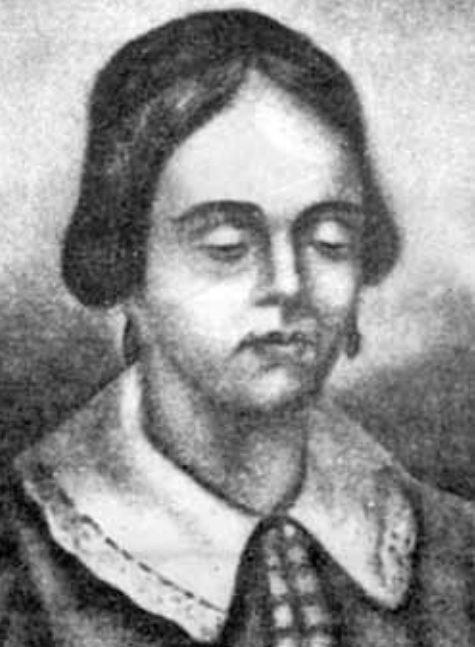
- Delfina Benigna da Cunha
- Born: São José do Norte
- Died: Rio de Janeiro
- Writing career
- Language: Portuguese
- Genre: Gaucho literature

Delfina Benigna da Cunha (1791–1857) was a Brazilian poet. Her works reflected the increasing socio-political participation of Brazilian women through literary and journalistic production. Da Cunha explored gender as well as imperial and national identities. She is also cited as a leading figure in the development of Gaucho literature.

da Cunha, a blind poet, was a subject of Stella Leonardos' work Romanceiro de Anita e Garibaldi e Romaceiro de Delfina.

== Biography ==
da Cunha was born on June 17, 1791, in São José do Norte, a municipality in Rio Grande do Sul. Her parents were Maria de Paula e Cunha and Joaquim Francisco da Cunha Sa e Meneses, who was a monarchist military official. da Cunha lost her vision after she contracted smallpox when she was 20 months old.

She would later receive a pension due to her father's service to the crown. There were few records detailing her early life but some of da Cunha's works indicated that she obtained some form of formal education based on a poem she dedicated to Pedro I in 1826. An account cited that she was granted the pension because of this sonnet or a series of poems she dedicated to the emperor. Her book Poesias oferecidas às senhoras rio-grandenses was the first ever publication printed in Rio Grande Sul.

Much of da Cunha's work had been neglected by literary historians. Some accounts of her life and works survived due to the work of Stella Leonardos, who used her biography and literary contributions in her own poetry. The discovery of da Cunha's archival works had been prompted by the recent interest in feminist criticism and Gaucho literature.

da Cunha died on 13 April 1857 in Rio de Janeiro. In 1994, Stella Leonardos published O romanceiro de Delfina, by the State Book Institute, a historical novel with the poet as its protagonist.

== Poetry ==
da Cunha's poetry often featured mythological elements and this was attributed to her classical education, which was predominant during her time. Recurring themes included eulogy, passion, romance, and patriotism. Death and romance, for example, are prominent in the following excerpt of her work:

O meu bem na despedida

Nem um só ai pode dar;

Apertou-me a mão no peito,

E depois pôs-se a chorar.

da Cunha also wrote in defense of the monarchy and attacked the Farroupilha Revolution or the Ragamuffin Revolt of Rio Grande do Sul in her works. She was particularly critical of Bento Gonçalves. Due to her political position, she moved to Rio de Janeiro when the conflict broke out in 1835 and stayed there for ten years. During this time, she was able to establish a literary circle and cultivated close friendship with noted female poets such as Beatriz Francisca de Assis Brandão, who wrote the poem Carta de Leandro a Hero, e Carta de Hero a Leandra in her honor.

=== Publications ===
- Poesias offerecidas as Senhoras Rio-Grandenses por sua patricia. Rio de Janeiro: Typographia Austral, 1838.
- Poesias oferecidas às senhoras brasileiras (1838)
- Coleção de várias poesias (dedicada à imperatriz viúva). Rio de Janeiro: Tipografia Laemmert's, 1846.
