= Marília de Dirceu =

1792 collection of poems by Tomás António Gonzaga

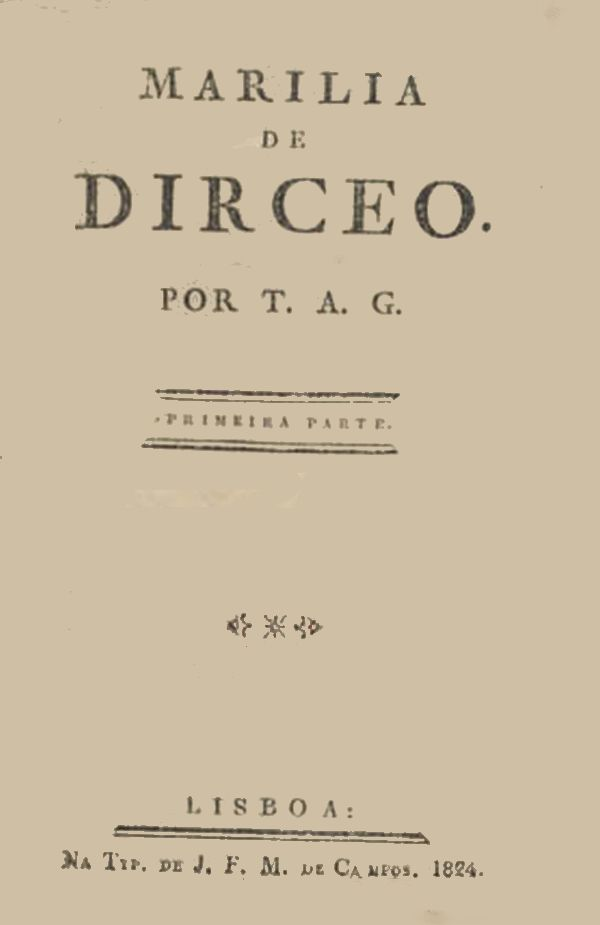
- The front cover of an 1824 edition of the book
- Author: Tomás António Gonzaga
- Language: Portuguese language
- Genre: Poetry
- Publisher: Tipografia Nunesiana
- Publication date: 1792
- Media type: Hardcover

Marília de Dirceu (English: Dirceu's Marília) is a poetry book written by Luso-Brazilian Neoclassic poet Tomás António Gonzaga. It is divided in three parts — all of them published in different years. The first part, published in 1792, has 33 "lyres" (or poems), and they tell mostly about Gonzaga's (using the pen name Dirceu on the book) love by a woman named Marília (who was, in real life, a girlfriend of his, Maria Doroteia Joaquina de Seixas Brandão). The second part, published in 1799, was written when Gonzaga was serving time in Ilha das Cobras because of his involvement with the unsuccessful Minas Conspiracy. Its 38 lyres focus now on Gonzaga's longing for freedom. The third part, published in 1802, has 9 lyres and 13 sonnets, and its authorship is disputed.

== Homages ==
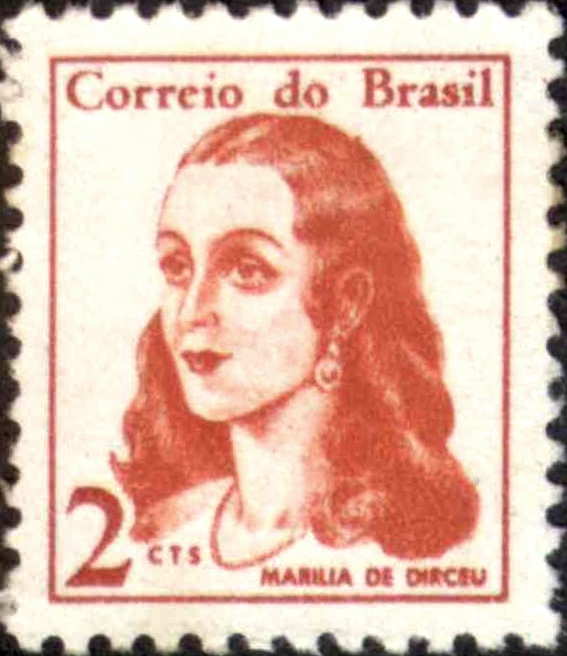
Marília de Dirceu on a 1967 stamp

- The city of Marília, in the Brazilian state of São Paulo, was so named as a tribute to the book.
- In 1967, the Brazilian postal service issued a collection of postage stamps depicting famous Brazilian women. One of the stamps depicted Marília, despite her status as a semi-fictional character.

== See also ==
- Cartas Chilenas
- A Ladeira da Saudade
