= Flag of Minas Gerais =

Official flag of the Brazilian state of Minas Gerais

State of Minas Gerais
- Use: Civil and state flag
- Proportion: 7:10
- Adopted: January 8, 1963; 63 years ago
- Design: A red triangle on a white background, surrounded by the Latin expression "Libertas quæ sera tamen" - motto of the Inconfidência Mineira, which means "Liberty, even if delayed".

The flag of Minas Gerais is one of the official symbols of the state of Minas Gerais, Brazil. The current flag was introduced by Law 2793 of January 8, 1963.

== History ==
The flag is based on the flag of the separatist Inconfidência Mineira movement, which sought to make the captaincy of Minas Gerais independent from then colonial Brazil. The equilateral triangle symbolizes the Holy Trinity and its color represents revolution.

The motto "LIBERTAS QUÆ SERA TAMEN" (often translated as "Liberty, even if delayed") was contributed to the original flag by the lawyer Alvarenga Peixoto from a verse in the Eclogues by the Latin poet Virgil, which reads "Libertas quae sera tamen respexit inertem", which can be translated as "Liberty, which, though late, (saw me) inert".

== Gallery ==
Descriptive drawing from Law 2793 of January 8, 1963

Flag of the Inconfidência Mineira (1789)

Variation of the Inconfidência Mineira (1789) flag

Flag of the Province of Minas Gerais, during the Empire of Brazil

Flag-insignia of the governor of Minas Gerais, used in military units.

Flag of the Government of the State of Minas Gerais
