= Cláudio Manuel da Costa =

Brazilian poet and musician

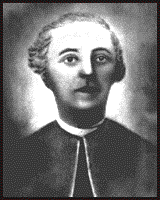
- Fictional depiction of Cláudio Manuel da Costa
- Born: 4 June 1729; Mariana, Minas Gerais, Portuguese Colony of Brazil
- Died: 4 July 1789 (aged 60); Ouro Preto, Minas Gerais, Portuguese Colony of Brazil
- Education: University of Coimbra
- Occupations: Poet, jurist, activist, lawyer
- Writing career
- Pen name: Glauceste Satúrnio
- Notable works: Vila Rica, Obras Poéticas de Glauceste Satúrnio
- Literary movement: Neoclassicism

Cláudio Manuel da Costa (June 4, 1729 – July 4, 1789) was a Brazilian poet and musician, considered to be the introducer of Neoclassicism in Brazil. He wrote under the pen name Glauceste Satúrnio, and his most famous work is the epic poem Vila Rica, that tells the history of the homonymous city, nowadays called Ouro Preto.

He is the patron of the 8th chair of the Brazilian Academy of Letters.

== Biography ==
Cláudio Manuel da Costa was born in the city of Vargem do Itacolomi (nowadays Mariana), to Portuguese João Gonçalves da Costa and Brazilian Teresa Ribeiro de Alvarenga. In 1749, he went to Lisbon, where he was graduated in Canon law in the University of Coimbra, where he composed most of his poems. Returning to Brazil, to the city of Ouro Preto, in 1754, he became a lawyer and a goldsmith.

He was the secretary of Minas Gerais from 1762 to 1765, and a judge of lands from 1769 to 1773. He founded in Ouro Preto a Neoclassic literary academy called "Colônia Ultramarina" ("Ultramarine Colony") in 1768, where he wrote many of his poems and performed the theatre play O Parnaso Obsequioso.

During the 1770s and the 1780s, he became friends with Tomás António Gonzaga, who exercised a great influence in Cláudio's work. According to studies made in the mid-20th century, the preface of Gonzaga's Cartas Chilenas (Chilean Letters) was written by Costa.

Along with Gonzaga and others, Cláudio was a member of the unsuccessful 1789 Minas Conspiracy. Arrested, he was killed in prison on July 4, 1789.

== Works ==
- Munúsculo Métrico (1751)
- Epicédio em Memória de Frei Gaspar da Encarnação (1753)
- Labirinto de Amor (1753)
- Obras Poéticas de Glauceste Satúrnio (1768 — reimpressed in 1903)
- Vila Rica (1773 — published in 1839)

== Representations in popular culture ==
Costa was portrayed by Emiliano Queiroz in the 1999 film Tiradentes, by Fernando Torres in the 1972 film Os Inconfidentes and in the 1969 telenovela Dez Vidas, and by Carlos Vereza in the 2003 film Aleijadinho: Paixão, Glória e Suplício.

Preceded by New creation	Brazilian Academy of Letters - Patron of the 8th chair	Succeeded by Alberto de Oliveira (founder)
