= Tomás António Gonzaga =

Brazilian poet (1744–1810)

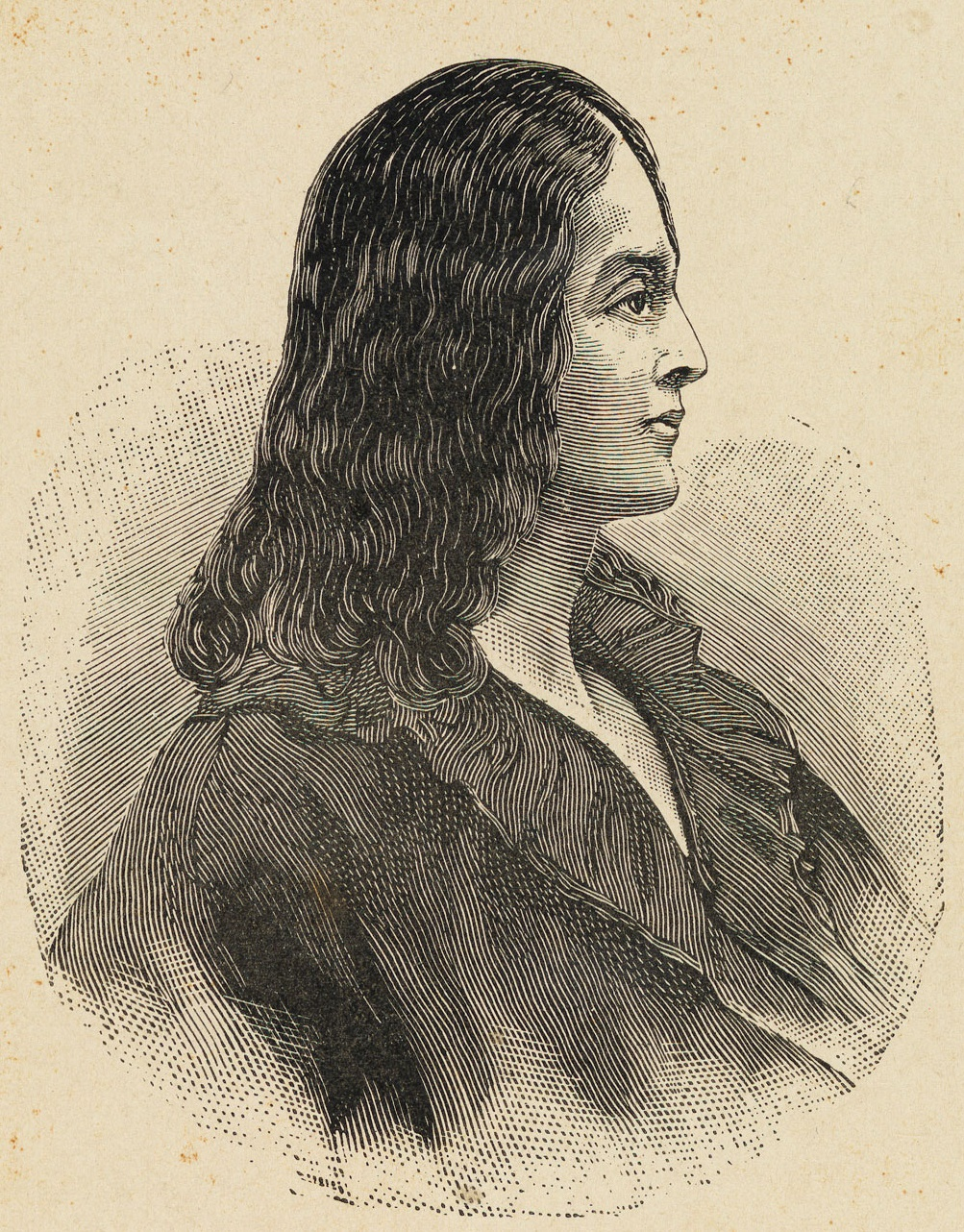
- A drawing of Gonzaga
- Born: 11 August 1744; Miragaia, Porto, Portugal
- Died: 1810 (aged 65–66); Island of Mozambique, Portuguese Colony of Mozambique
- Education: University of Coimbra
- Occupations: Poet, jurist, activist
- Spouse: Juliana de Sousa Mascarenhas
- Children: Ana Mascarenhas Gonzaga, Alexandre Mascarenhas Gonzaga
- Writing career
- Pen name: Dirceu
- Notable works: Marília de Dirceu, Cartas Chilenas
- Movement: Neoclassicism

Tomás António Gonzaga (11 August 1744 – c. 1810) was a Portuguese poet. One of the most famous Neoclassic writers in colonial Brazil, he was also the ouvidor and the ombudsman of the city of Ouro Preto (formerly "Vila Rica"), as well as the desembargador of the appeal court in Bahia. He wrote under the pen name Dirceu.

He is patron of the 37th chair of the Brazilian Academy of Letters.

== Biography ==
Gonzaga was born in the freguesia (or parish) of Miragaia, in Porto, to João Bernardo Gonzaga and Tomásia Isabel Clark, who was of British descent. Tomásia died when Gonzaga was 1 year old, and soon after his mother's death, he and his father moved to Recife, and then to Bahia, where João Bernardo served at the magistrature and was desembargador of the appeal court, and Gonzaga studied at a Jesuit school. Gonzaga was sent back to Portugal as a teenager, to the University of Coimbra, to finish his studies and, at 24 years old, he finished his Law course. He presented himself as a candidate for a chair at the University, with the thesis Tratado de Direito Natural, heavily influenced by Enlightenment ideals.

Gonzaga became the juiz de fora of the city of Beja in 1778, until 1781. In the following year, he returned to Brazil, becoming the ouvidor of the city of Vila Rica (nowadays Ouro Preto). He held this post until 1789, when he was accused of being involved with the Minas Conspiracy. Arrested, he was sent to a prison in Ilha das Cobras, Rio de Janeiro. He spent three years in prison, and although he asserted his innocence, the authorities were influenced by his friendship with the conspirators. In 1792 he was sentenced to perpetual exile in Angola, later commuted to a ten-year exile on the Island of Mozambique. By that time, he was engaged to a woman named Maria Doroteia Joaquina de Seixas Brandão, possibly the "Marília" of his verses. His hope of being freed from his prison in order to see his beloved again is a prominent theme of the second part of his poetry book Marília de Dirceu.

Arriving at Mozambique, he fell ill and was charitably received by a wealthy Portuguese gentleman. He then married his daughter, Juliana de Sousa Mascarenhas, having with her two children: Ana and Alexandre.

Gonzaga lived the rest of his life in exile, having a wealthy and happy life and becoming a lawyer. He would die of a tropical disease he contracted; his date of death is unknown, although it is commonly accepted to be in 1810. His remains are currently interred at the Museu da Inconfidência in Ouro Preto.

== Works ==
- Marília de Dirceu, poetry collection (1792)
- Cartas Chilenas, discontinued series of satirical poems (1863)

His reputation rests on Marília, which contains all his published verses and is organized into two parts, corresponding with the stages of his life, the second having been written in prison.

== Representations in popular culture ==
- Gonzaga was portrayed in many Brazilian telenovels and films. He was portrayed by Gianfrancesco Guarnieri in the telenovel Dez Vidas (1969); by Luiz Linhares in the film Os Inconfidentes (1972) and by Eduardo Galvão in the film Tiradentes (1999).
- In the 1984 children's book A Ladeira da Saudade, by Brazilian author Ganymédes José, Gonzaga's unrequited love by Maria Doroteia is explored on a more modern context.

Preceded by New creation	Brazilian Academy of Letters - Patron of the 37th chair	Succeeded by José Júlio da Silva Ramos (founder)
