= Inconfidência Mineira =

18th century separatist movement in Colonial Brazil

Minas Gerais Conspiracy
- Part of the Atlantic Revolutions
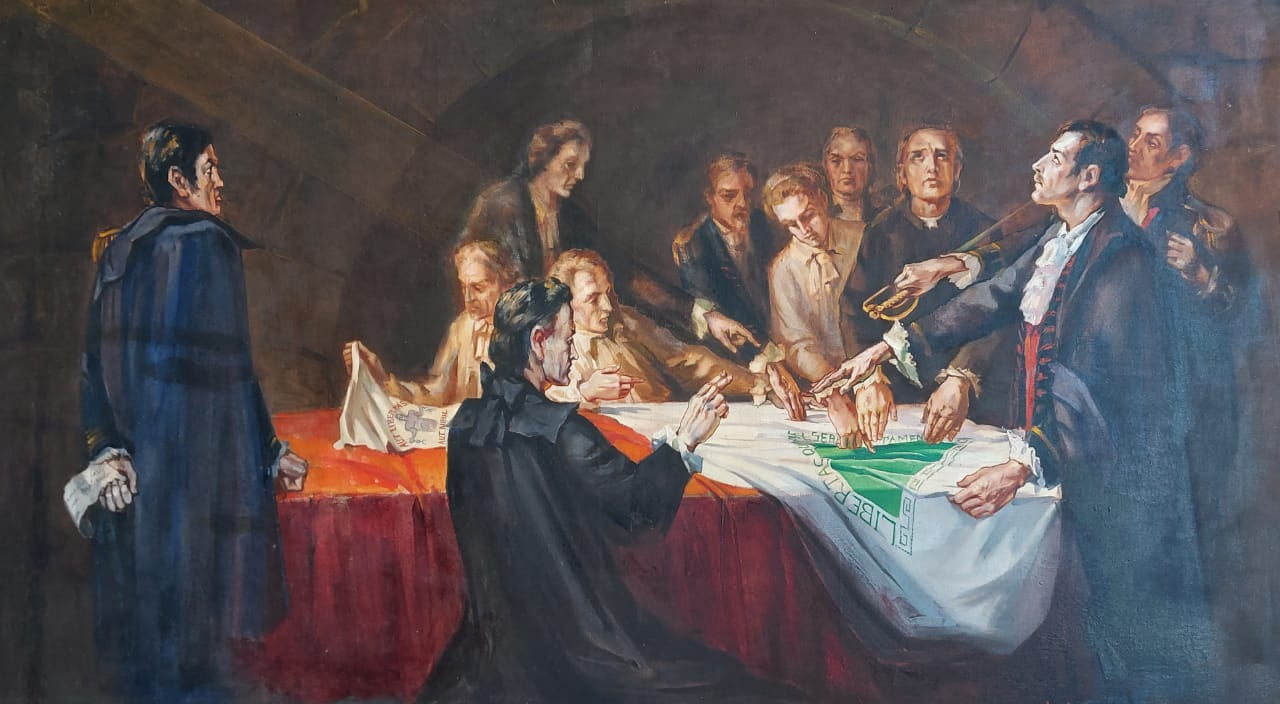
- The conspirators' flag, by Carlos Oswald
- Native name: Inconfidência Mineira
- Date: 1789
- Location: Captaincy of Minas Gerais, State of Brazil
- Cause: Portuguese repression motivated by the exhaustion of the mines; Imminence of the derrama in 1789
- Target: Establishment of an independent republic
- Participants: Tiradentes (executed); Freire de Andrade; José Álvares Maciel; Tomás António Gonzaga; Maia e Barbalho
- Outcome: Revolt denounced before its outbreak; Most of the leaders were exiled; Tiradentes sentenced to death

The Inconfidência Mineira (Portuguese pronunciation: [ĩkõfiˈdẽsiɐ miˈnejɾɐ]; "Minas Gerais Conspiracy") was an unsuccessful separatist movement in Colonial Brazil in 1789. It was the result of a confluence of external and internal causes. The external inspiration was the independence of thirteen British colonies in North America following the American Revolutionary War, a development that impressed the intellectual elite of particularly the captaincy of Minas Gerais.

The main internal cause of the conspiracy was the decline of gold mining in that captaincy. As gold became less plentiful, the region's gold miners faced increasing difficulties in fulfilling tax obligations to the Portuguese crown (the tax over gold was one-fifth). When the captaincy could not satisfy the royal demand for gold, it was burdened with an additional tax on gold, called derrama.

Conspirators seeking independence from Portugal planned to rise up in rebellion on the day that the derrama would be instituted. However, the conspirators lacked both well-formed plans and an overall leader. Some of the conspirators were republicans, others were monarchists. Some favored the abolition of slavery, while others deemed abolition as impractical at that time. The conspirators did put forth a few economic and social ideas: the promotion of cotton production, the exploitation of iron and saltpeter reserves, a proposal to give incentives to mothers to have many children, and the creation of a citizens' militia.

The flag proposed by the conspirators for the new republic, which became the basis for the current Flag of Minas Gerais. The inscription in Latin reads "Freedom, albeit late"

The conspiracy attracted a great number of military personnel, priests, and intellectuals, as well as the poets Cláudio Manuel da Costa and Tomás Antônio Gonzaga (1744–1807?). Among the best known participants were Joaquim José da Silva Xavier, best known as "Tiradentes"; José Álvares Maciel, a philosopher and chemistry student; and lieutenant colonel Francisco de Paula Freire de Andrade (1756–1792) of the regiment of dragoons. Tiradentes, who came from Andrade's regiment, was the independence movement's most enthusiastic propagandist.

== Conspirators ==
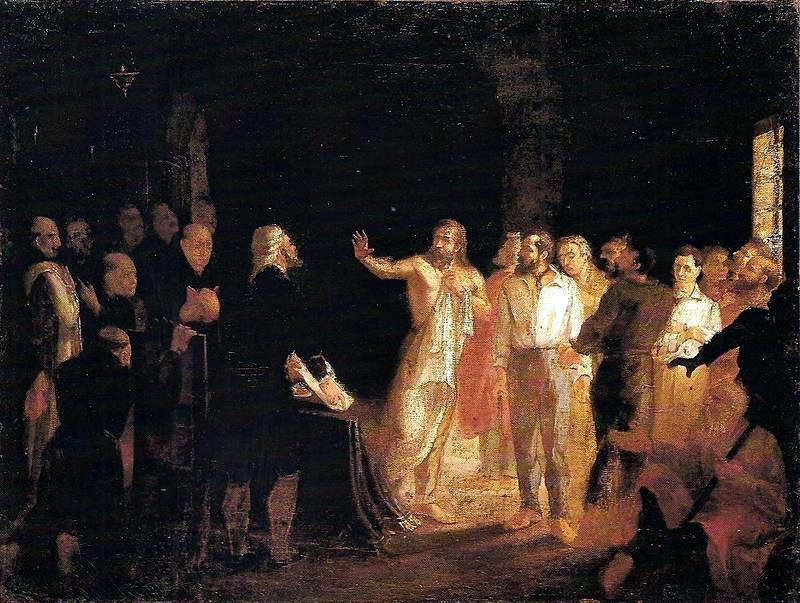
Response of Joaquim José da Silva Xavier, known as Tiradentes, to the commutation of the rebels' punishment

The Inconfidência was inspired by the ideals of the French liberal philosophers of the Age of Enlightenment and the successful American Revolution. The conspirators largely belonged to the white upper class of minerals-rich Minas Gerais. Many had studied in Europe, especially in the University of Coimbra, and some had large debts with the colonial government. In the context of declining gold production, the intention of the Portuguese government to impose the obligatory payment of all debts (the derrama) was a leading cause behind the conspiracy. Many of the conspirators wanted to create a republic in which the leader would be chosen through democratic elections. The capital would be São João del Rei, and Ouro Preto would become a university town. The structure of the society, including the right to property and the ownership of slaves, would be kept intact.

Eventually, three participants in the independence movement revealed the conspirators' plans to the government, and the rebels were arrested in 1789. Among the movement were the lawyer Alvarenga Peixoto, the poets Tomás Antônio Gonzaga and Cláudio Manuel da Costa, the priest José da Silva de Oliveira Rolim, and the alferes Joaquim José da Silva Xavier (a.k.a. "Tiradentes"). After Joaquim Silvério dos Reis (1756–1792), a member of the conspiracy, informed on the movement before it could take place, Peixoto was captured, arrested, and sent to exile in the city of Ambaca, in Portuguese Angola, another colony of the Portuguese Empire, where he remained until the end of his life.

== Aftermath ==
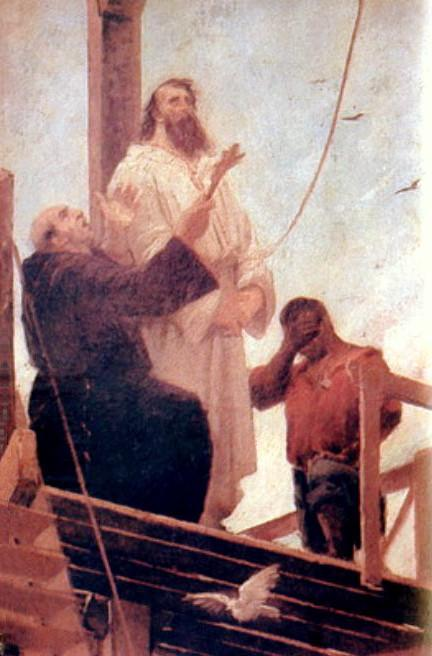
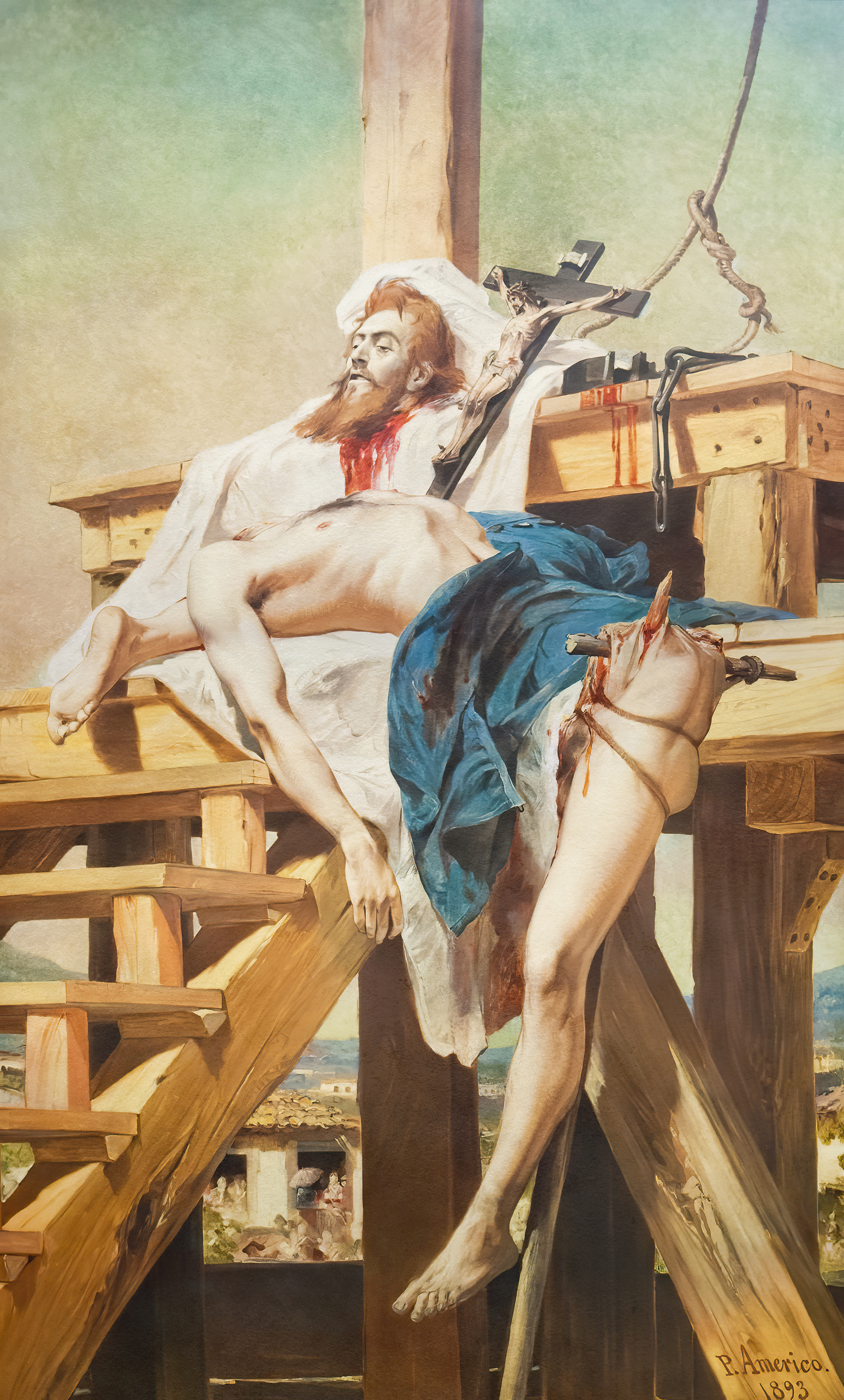
The execution and quartering of Tiradentes

Judicial proceedings against the conspirators lasted from 1789 to 1792. Lieutenant Colonel Freire de Andrade, Tiradentes, José Álvares Maciel, and eight others were condemned to the gallows. Seven more were condemned to perpetual banishment in Africa, the rest were acquitted. Following the trial Queen Maria I commuted the sentences of capital punishment to perpetual banishment for all except those whose activities involved aggravated circumstances. That was the case for Tiradentes, who took full responsibility for the conspiracy movement and was imprisoned in Rio de Janeiro, where he was hanged on 21 April 1792. Afterwards, his body was torn into pieces, which were sent to Vila Rica in the captaincy of Minas Gerais, to be displayed in the places where he had propagated his revolutionary ideas. The anniversary of his death is celebrated as a national holiday in Brazil.

In 1948 the events were portrayed in the film Minas Conspiracy directed by Carmen Santos.

In 1963, Minas Gerais incorporated as its state flag the one designed by the Inconfidência, with an equilateral triangle inspired by the Holy Trinity – albeit supposedly the inconfidentes wanted a green triangle, while Minas' flag uses a red one – and a Latin motto taken out of Vergil's Eclogues.

== See also ==
- List of historical acts of tax resistance
- Vila Rica Revolt
