= Padre Roma =

José Inácio Ribeiro de Abreu e Lima
- Born: 1768; Recife
- Died: March 29, 1817 (aged 48–49); Campo de Santana, Salvador
- Cause of death: Executed by firing squad
- Resting place: Sant'Anna Church
- Other names: José de Santa Rosa, Padre Roma
- Occupations: priest, lawyer
- Known for: participating on the Pernambucan revolution
- Children: At least 2, including José Inácio de Abreu e Lima
- Father: Francisco Ignácio Ribeiro de Abreu e Lima
- Religion: Roman catholic
- Church: Carmo Convent
- Ordained: Friar of the carmelite order, priest of the Catholic Church
- Laicized: 1807

José Inácio Ribeiro de Abreu e Lima (1768–1817), known as José de Santa Rosa and Padre Roma, was a liberal priest and lawyer. A Freemason, he was shot dead at Campo de Santana by orders of Marcos de Noronha e Brito for trying to gather support of the Captaincy of Bahia during the Pernambucan revolution.

== Biography ==
José Inácio Ribeiro de Abreu e Lima was born in 1768, Recife, son of captain Francisco Ignácio Ribeiro de Abreu e Lima and grandson of colonel Lourenço Gomes de Abreu e Lima. He was part of the Carmo Convent in Goiana, being ordained in 1784 as friar of the carmelite order, where he became known as José de Santa Rosa. He later became a drawing teacher at Seminary of Olinda. After his initial studies, he went to Coimbra and graduated in theology, being ordained a priest of the Catholic Church in Rome. He was laicized from the church in 1807 by the sentence of an ecclesiastical court for talking about his liberal and anticolonialist ideas during his sermons.

Back in the State of Brazil, José Inácio abandoned his clerical role, got married and became a lawyer, thus being nicknamed "Padre Roma" (Father Rome). He used to wear the symbols of the Order of Christ, even though he was not ordained. In 1807, shortly before the transfer of the Portuguese court to Brazil, he proposed that the Portuguese court should be only received if Dom João VI signed a constitution, but his idea was denied by his peers. He became a disciple and personal friend of Father Arruda Câmara and was initiated as a Freemason at the Areopagus Lodge.

In 1817, after the beginning of the Pernambucan revolution, Padre Roma was chosen to be sent to Sirinhaém to raise animosity for the republican cause, due to his oratory skills. He was successful in his mission, and was then sent to the Captaincy of Bahia, where he should meet the acquittances of Domingos Teotônio Jorge to gather support for their cause. He was traveling with his son, Luiz, both disguised as coconut sellers. They went to Salvador by jangada accompanied by two jangadeiros but were arrested on 26 March. There are two versions for their arrest. The first states that the troops were already waiting for them when they disembarked on Itapoã beach; the second states that the owner of the jangada anchored amongst the Fortes de São Diogo and Santa Maria and asked one of his employees to buy food at Simplício Manoel da Costa's tavern, but the latter went to the jangada to buy coconut and recognized Padre Roma, escorting him to Forte de São Pedro. During his arrest, he managed to destroy several compromising documents, including the proclamation Denodados patriotas bahianos.

Both of them were arrested in the same prison Padre Roma's other son, Abreu e Lima, was being held. One day later, Marcos de Noronha e Brito established a Military Commission without communicating Dom João VI's administration. Padre Roma argued he came to intercede for his son, but Marcos de Noronha e Brito ordered him to be executed with arquebus shots, which happened on 29 March at Campo de Santana. Both his sons watched his death. His death was notified by Idade d'Ouro do Brazil, quickly spreading to the nearby captaincies and generating fear amongst the revolutionaries.

== Homages ==
His son José adopted the surname "Roma" and wrote about his father on the periodical Diario Novo on 28 July 1845.

Abreu e Lima wrote about the life of his father in the book Compendio da Historia do Brasil (Compendium of the History of Brazil) (1843). In 1834, during the Praieira revolt, Abreu e Lima commanded troops nicknamed "romeiros", as a homage to his father. Later, several people, including Empáfia de Vasconcelos and Evaristo da Veiga used Padre Roma's image to criticize Abreu e Lima's support for Dom Pedro I.

In 2017, during the celebration of the 200 years of Padre Roma's death, a statue of him was built in Campo da Pólvora and a mass was celebrated at Sant'Anna Church, where his remains were laid to rest.

He was portrayed with other revolutionaries on the Leão do Norte (Northern Lion) stained glass of Campo das Princesas Palace.
