= Seminary of Olinda =

Roman Catholic seminary in Pernambuco, Brazil

Coordinates: 8.0127°S 34.8479°W

Archdiocesan Seminary of Our Lady of Grace
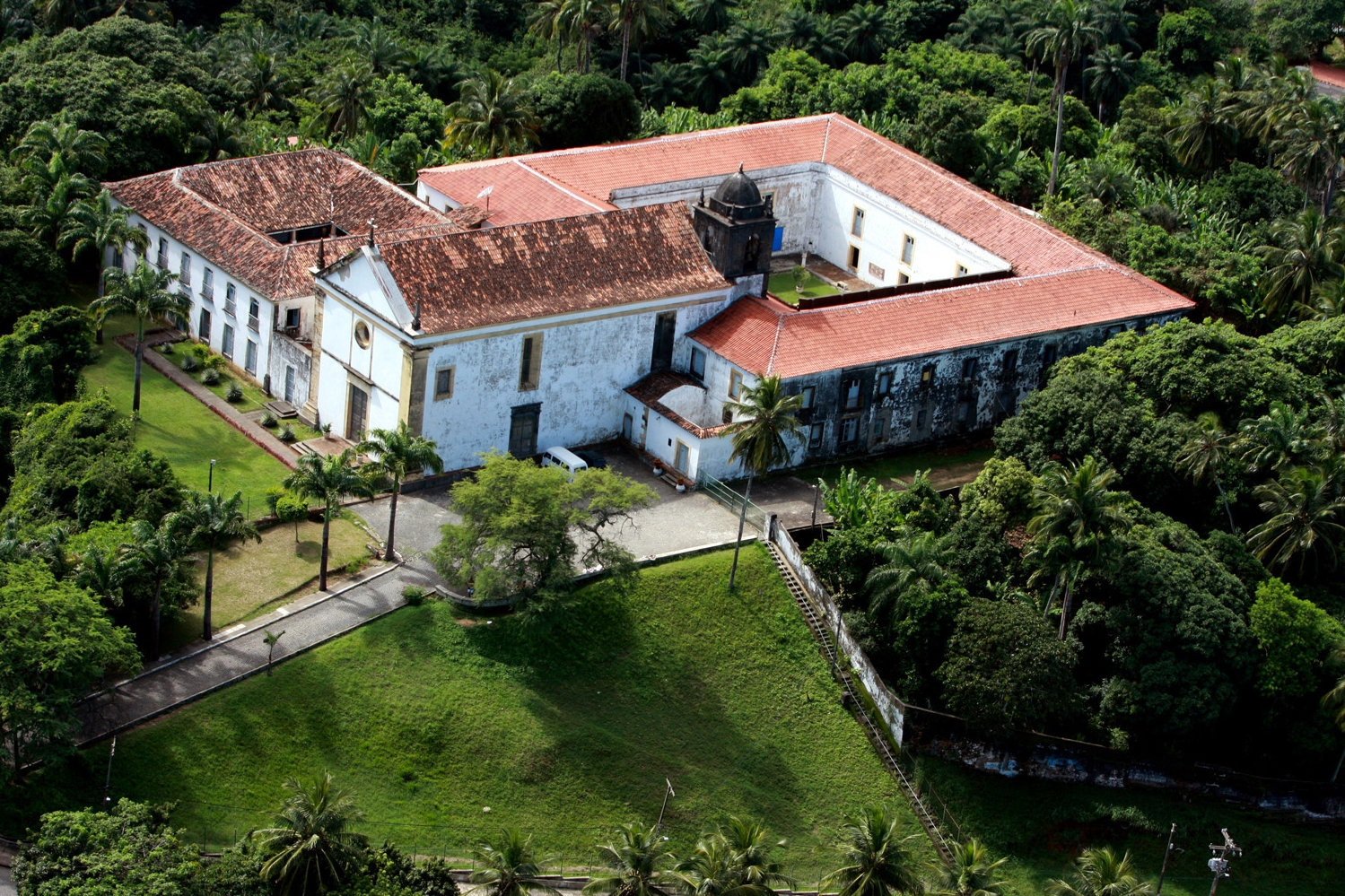
- Other name: Seminary of Olinda
- Type: Seminary
- Established: February 16, 1800
- Founder: Dom Azeredo Coutinho
- Religious affiliation: Roman Catholic Church
- Rector: Lenildo Santana da Silva
- Location: Olinda, Pernambuco, Brazil

Seminário Arquidiocesano Nossa Senhora da Graça, also known as Seminário de Olinda, is a seminary from Church of Our Lady of Grace, inaugurated by Dom Azeredo Coutinho in 1800. It was Brazil's main educational institution after the reforms made by Marquês de Pombal. It brought to Brazil ideas from the Age of Enlightenment and many of the students were part of the Pernambucan revolution and the Confederation of the Equator. The seminary was known for teaching several topics previously not related to theology, including natural sciences, but it was reformed in 1936 to focus exclusively on the ecclesiastic education.

== History ==
Seminário de Olinda was inaugurated by Dom Azeredo Coutinho on 16 February 1800 in Olinda. The terrain, where Colégio de Olinda was previously located, was donated by D. Maria I. The seminary preached the theology of illustration, that followed the reforms made by Marquês de Pombal, that led to the suppression of the Society of Jesus in Brazil, and was deeply influenced by the reform of the University of Coimbra in 1772. It inaugurated with 133 students. Many of the students did not have the objective of becoming a clergyman, due to the amount of classes relevant to the local elites.

Students would often discuss liberal ideas, with many partaking in Latin American revolutions, such as the Pernambucan revolution and the Confederation of the Equator. In 1817, the seminary was closed as a consequence of the Pernambucan revolution. It soon reopened, with only 19 students. In 1827, the seminary lost even more students due to the creation of other schools, such as Colégio das Artes and Liceu Provincial de Pernambuco. In 1830, Dom Azevedo Coutinho was fired because of the "lack of discipline from the students".

In 1936, the seminary altered their statutes and focused exclusively on the ecclesiastic graduation. The seminary was interdicted in 2015, reformed in 2018, and reopened in December 2022.

== Enrollment and rules ==
Seminário de Olinda was considered the best secondary school in Brazil from its time. The statutes, named Estatutos do Seminário Episcopal de N. Senhora da Graça da Cidade de Olinda de Pernambuco (Statutes of the Epicospal Seminary of Our Lady of Grace of the City of Olinda of Pernambuco), were written in 1798. The first detailed financial matters of the seminary, the second dissertated about the ethics of the relationship of one with God, oneself and others, and the third explained the basis of Age of Enlightenment as its philosophy and its curriculum. Topics not covered by the statutes were decided based on the statutes of the University of Coimbra.

Students must have been a boy of at least 12 years old to enroll and graduate at 15 years old, but they could opt to continue their studies up until they are 18 years old. The statutes specified that the students who ought to live in its facilities must be poor. In the first year two-thirds of them were members of rich families that helped their studies with donations to the seminary. Rich students also didn't have to be in conformity with all the prerequisites the poor had to be, just "the most part" of them. Vacancies for enrollment were divulged in the municipal chambers of the freguesias for ten to twenty days and at the door of the churches. Classes began on 3 February and ended on 7 December.

Students must wear black robes and a purple gown to attend to classes. They slept with white clothes. Some kinds of footwear, such as silk socks, were forbidden for poor students for not going according to their poverty. All clothes had to be marked and the student had the obligation of bringing a chest to organize his belongings. The school provided the renovation of clothes, which happened every three years, a barber, a surgeon and doctor for students that didn't have access to one. The school also paid the medicine for sick students and buried them in the church cemetery if they died.

Students had three meals a day, and from a certain age they sometimes practiced religious fasting.

Students who lived in the seminary could be granted permission to leave to see their relatives. They should return for dinner, if they left in the morning, or during the sunset if they left in the afternoon. Students couldn't talk at night. They also had to amicably reprehend their peers if they spoke offensive words or acted wrongly, but if the matter persisted, the rector should be warned.

There were several religious rites students must attend. They must've sung Veni Sancte Spiritus while kneeling after waking up. Afterwards, they ought to listen to a mass given by the rector. At night they sang Hail Mary and Rosary. On Sundays and religious holidays, they attended mass in the cathedral, except for two students who helped the rector conduct the mass in the seminary. Once a month, students took turns to confess their sins and commune sacramentally.

== Curriculum ==
If the student was analphabet, it ought to have classes on Thursdays to learn the basics of Portuguese, arithmetic and Christian doctrine. There were also non-mandatory plainsong classes for students with aptitude for music. Afterwards, the student learned Latin grammar, divided into three modules, rhetorics, philosophy, which was divided into logic, metaphysics and ethics, natural history, chemistry and drawing. In the last year, it was taught theology, which was further subdivided into scholastics, speculative and practical theology. Speculatve and practical theology were respectively subdivided into speculative, dogmatic, symbolic, positive and polemical; and moral, disciplinary and liturgic. There were also subjects about pastoral theology and canonical theology. Following the example of the University of Coimbra, the philosophy classes were later divided into rational, ethics and natural philosophy. The philosophy, grammar and rhetoric classes were later incorporated in the College of Arts in 1832 and became influential in the Bachelor of Laws in Brazil.

Teachers should use didaticic material approved by the Literary Commission, but they were free to elaborate their own material if they deemed necessary. Classes were focused in connecting different subjects, and always started with a review from the previous class. If a student expressed doubt about a topic, the teacher invited other students to explain it to him. Classes ended with the teacher briefly explaining what would be studied in the next class. Students should study it previously. On Saturdays, the teacher picked six students at random to debate what had been learned during the weekend. Stuends should also write a dissertation every week that should be delivered in eight days. Classes were one hour long, but if the student was having difficulties with a subject, he had extra classes at the teacher's house. Final tests happened after 15 of November. Students were expelled from the seminary if they failed a subject twice.

First letters classes emphasized the correct intonation of words, reading cadence, writing, including the correct way to grab the quill, basic arithmetic (addition, subtraction, multiplication, division, and cross-multiplication), and Christian doctrine.

Plainsong classes taught music theory from several music styles, but practice was only made with plainsong. Students were part of the choir and helped on the masses.

The Latin grammar classes began with parsing and morphological analysis. Students then translated texts from Portuguese to Latin. Later, they ought to study syllables individually and translate texts from Simplicius of Cilicia, Septimius Severus, Julius Caesar and Cicero. Advanced students translated texts from Salutius, Titus Livius, Terence, and Latin poetry. Students had to give their notebooks to the rector when it was completelly fulfilled to be signed and locked away, possibly because it could contain "advanced ideas" for its time.

Rhetorics classes analyzed the works of Cicero and Quintilian. Students also had to talk in the pulpit to practice their eloquence. There were also debates and the study of the rules of poetry, based on the works of Horace, Camões, and others. World history was also taught.

The philosophy classes emphasized experimental physics, in contrast with the up until then dominating franciscan approach on aristotelian physics. It focused on mechanics and hydrostatics, to help the State of Brazil develop machinery to advance its agriculture and mining. The natural history classes were focused on the study of the animalia, plantae and mineral kingdoms, with field classes to raise practical awareness about them. The classes also aimed to produce dissertations to create a natural history collection in the seminary.

In geography classes, students learned about Euclidean geometry and elementary algebra. Algebra classes also stressed the importance of scientific methodology.

If the student decided to keep studying, he first studied a subject called ecclesiastical history, where he reviewed what he had learned in rhetoric classes and proceeded to the History of the Catholic Church. He then proceeded to speculative theology, where he studied explanations of the catholic faith and dogmas, including the original sin, the role of Jesus Christ, the Holy Trinity, doctrines coming from the Bible and synods, the divine right of the pope, amongst other topics. The last year was dedicated to practical theology, that began with a study of Christian ethics and later the Catholic rules and customs, and how to apply them to daily life. General theology focused on topics related to salvation, while particular focused on their relation with the church ministries.

== Academic staff ==
Besides the teacher, the staff was originally divided as follows:

- Rector: Responsible for applying the seminary statutes and for the finances of the seminary. He was also responsible for regulation of the students' behavior during his walks and made surprise visits to their chambers during nights to guarantee the rule of silence was being observed. The rector also gave permission for students to visit their relatives once a month and could give prizes and punishments. He was also responsible for safekeeping the seminary archive, where enrollments, expenditures, and other sensible data.
- Vice-rector: Responsible for giving money and inspecting purchases necessary for the seminary.
- Sacristan: Responsible for maintaining the church of the seminary and ringing the bell when necessary. He also served dinner for the students.
- Gatekeeper: Responsible for letting people in and out of the seminary. He sometimes received letters that should be passed to the rector. He delivered the keys to the rector after the end of the day and reported any relevant occurrences to him. This job was deemed sensible, as he interacted with kids, and should be fulfilled by a man of "known probity".
- Barber: Responsible for cutting the hair and beard of the students once or twice a week. He also set the tables up before meals, collected dirty clothes and replaced them with clean ones. He was the only one who had constant, direct contact with the students.
- Cook: Responsible for preparing meals and serving them in equal parts for the students.
- Kitchen hand: Responsible for helping the cook, including washing all the dishes.
- Cerqueiro: Responsible for planting and harvesting.
- Purchaser: Responsible for buying supplies for the seminary.

Originally, finances and sensible documents were kept in a safe in the rector's room. The only ones in possession of the key were the rector himself, the vicar general and the dean. All money taken from the safe should be signed for one of them. A Board of Ministers, also named Board of Economy, was responsible for deciding matters of relevant costs of the seminary. It was made of six deputies, chosen from members of the church, and a president, usually the rector himself. They united four times a year: in February, during Easter, during festa junina, in October, and during the day of Our Lady of Aparecida. There was also a final meeting during December to check the year expenditures and eventually correct them.

Besides the administrative staff, there was also the teaching staff:

- Director of studies: Responsible for the direction, inspection and administration of the college. It was usually fulfilled by the rector.
- Vice-director of studies: Responsible for applying the college rules. All the teachers were his subordinates. He also substituted the director of studides when necessary. He was also responsible for finding resolutions for fights amongst the staff and students, and also keeping track of the progress of the students.
- Secretary of congregations: Responsible for approving the didactic books and writing down the decisions of the Literary Comisison. He also kept a diary with registers of notorious successes of the General Literary History of Our Kingdom and the Literary History of the seminary and the diocese. The secretary was chosen through voting.
- Librarian: He safeguarded and organized the books of the seminary, besides maintaining the library. He was chosen by voting of the Literary Commission, and should preferably be someone with knowledge of Literary History and its bibliography.
- Bedel: He ordered the bell to be rang in the beginning and end of classes, warned students about their tests, organized the documents related to their approval, and served as gatekeeper during the meetings of the Board of Ministers and the Literary Commission. The role was fulfilled by the sacristan.
- Teacher: Responsible for teaching the subjects decided by the Literary Commission. The vacancies were fulfilled through a public tender.

Decisions about the curriculum were made up by the Literary Commission, a teaching board made of the teachers and the director of studies. The board met twice a year, at the beginning and at the end of the year.

== Notorious members ==
=== Professors ===
- Padre Miguelinho
- Frei Miguel Joaquim Pegado
- Padre João Ribeiro da Pessoa
- Frei Caneca
- Padre João Ribeiro

=== Alumni ===
- Frei Caneca
