= José Inácio de Abreu e Lima =

Brazilian military officer, politician, journalist and writer

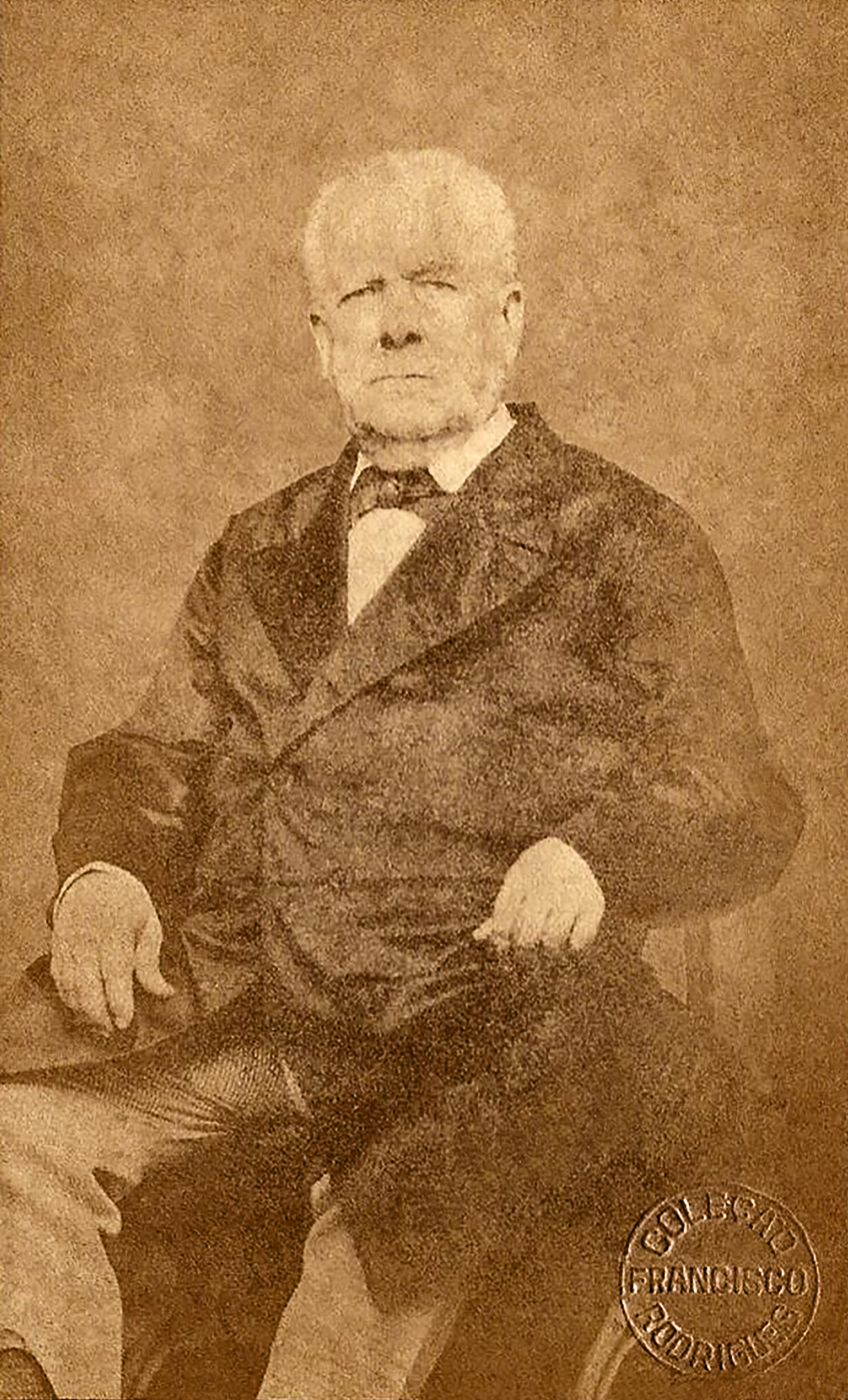
- Abreu e Lima
- Born: José Inácio de Abreu e Lima; April 6, 1794; Recife, Captaincy of Pernambuco, Colonial Brazil
- Died: August 3, 1869 (aged 75) Recife, Province of Pernambuco, Empire of Brazil
- Allegiance: United Kingdom of Portugal, Brazil and the Algarves; Gran Colombia
- Conflicts: Venezuelan War of Independence: Battle of Carabobo; Bolívar's campaign to liberate New Granada: Battle of Boyacá; Peruvian War of Independence: Battle of Ayacucho

José Inácio de Abreu e Lima (6 April 1794 — 8 March 1869) was a Brazilian military officer, politician, journalist and writer. Even though he was born in Brazil, he participated prominently in the Spanish American wars of independence. Because of this, he is known with greater notoriety as General Abreu y Lima for having been one of the generals of Simón Bolívar, one of the main leaders of the liberation of Hispanic America.

== Biography ==
Abreu e Lima was born in Recife, then the capital of the captaincy of Pernambuco in Colonial Brazil, on 6 April 1794. His family was one of the richest in Brazil at that time, which owned plantations and slaves. The Abreu e Lima family also had a solid philosophical, scientific and language education.

He graduated as a captain of artillery in 1816 from the Royal Military Academy in Rio de Janeiro.

José Inácio's father, José Inácio Ribeiro de Abreu e Lima, known as Padre Roma, was one of the leaders of the so called Pernambucan Revolt of 1817. Once the rebellion was suppressed, Inácio's father was condemned to death by firing squad for being sent by the rebellion to Salvador in order to incite the province to join the revolt. At that time, the Ordinances of the Kingdom of Portugal, that is, the code of laws in force, did not limit its lèse-majesté punishments to those condemned of such crimes, but also imposed them on the second generation, thus, as a young captain in the beginning of his career, the execution of Inácio's father under these conditions put an end to his military career in Brazil. Inácio and his brother were sent to prison.

He escaped from prison in the province of Bahia with his brother Luis Inácio, in 1818, and went to the United States, from where the revolutionary example was projected, as well as from France, and the Enlightenment and radical liberal ideas. There he met a brother of Bolívar and left for Venezuela, passing through Puerto Rico. On Venezuelan soil, he wrote to Bolívar and voluntarily enlisted in his army as a captain, serving in it for 13 years until 1831, little after Bolívar's death, in December 1830. In his first letter to Bolívar, Abreu e Lima committed himself, in his own handwriting, “to sacrifice himself for the independence and freedom of Venezuela, and for all of South America”.

With the death of Bolívar, the newly formed government that succeeded him, under the rule of Francisco de Paula Santander, did not recognize Inácio's military rank.

== Bibliography ==
- Melo, Ricardo Abreu de (2016). Abreu e Lima: um brasileiro entre os Libertadores da América (PDF) (in Portuguese). São Paulo: Anais do II Simpósio Internacional Pensar e Repensar a América Latina. ISBN 978-85-7205-159-0.
