= Idade d'Ouro do Brazil =

- Front page of the first edition
- Type: daily, biweekly, bimonthly
- Owner: Manuel Antônio da Silva Serva
- Founder: Manuel Antônio da Silva Serva
- Publisher: Typographia de Serva & Carvalho
- Founded: May 14, 1811
- Ceased publication: June 24, 1823
- Political alignment: conservatism
- Language: Portuguese
- Headquarters: Salvador
- Circulation: about 200 issues
- Price: 60 réis

Idade d'Ouro do Brazil (Brazil's Golden Age), nicknamed the Gazeta da Bahia (Bahia's Gazette), was a newspaper inaugurated in Salvador on 14 May 1811. Inaugurated by Manuel Antônio da Silva Serva and under patronage of the Governor-General of the Captaincy of Bahia, Marcos de Noronha e Brito, the periodical was the second newspaper established on Brazilian soil, losing to Gazeta do Rio de Janeiro (1808).

The newspaper was conservative, openly defending the Portuguese Crown's interest in Brazil. As consequence, it was nicknamed Idade de Ferro (Iron Age) by its critics, especially Correio Braziliense. It deemed slavery a "necessary evil" and was against several revolutions that sought independence from the Portuguese Empire, such as the Pernambucan revolution and the Brazilian War of Independence.

After the Independence of Brazil, the newspaper firmly resisted the newly formed Empire, criticizing even Noronha e Brito, who classified it as an enemy of his. It was published until 24 June 1823.

== History ==
Idade d'Ouro do Brazil was created in Salvador by the Portuguese merchant Manuel Antônio da Silva Serva. It was the second periodical to be published in Brazilian soil, losing to Gazeta do Rio de Janeiro (1808). (Note: There is dispute if it was in fact the second periodical published in Brazil, as in October 1810 Alexandre José Vieira would have installed a printing press bought in London to print "mercantile knowledge", and the Jesuit priest Serafim Leite affirmed that his college had possession of several printouts produced locally, but none of those affirmations are confirmed.) The periodical was printed in Serva's publishing house, Typographia de Serva & Carvalho, with first edition being released on 14 May 1811 under the protection of the Governor-General of the Captaincy of Bahia, Marcos de Noronha e Brito, who acted as the government's official reviewer.

The periodical was sold in eight points of Recife and in the countryside, including in Cachoeira. It was also sold in Rio de Janeiro by Paulo Martins, but he soon took it out of the catalogue due to commercial failure.

Sales were not good, and soon the publishing house began to suffer from financial problems. Serva tried several times to take a loan from the government to build new machinery, qualify personnel, expand his business and cut and export brazilwood to finance his venture, but it was denied several times. In 1815, Serva successfully took a loan from the Board of Finance and used it to buy new machinery from Europe and hire a book seller from Lisbon. His printing press raised the number of periodicals and sales by order boosted, as his periodicals were cheaper than the government's.

In 1919, Idade d'Ouro do Brazil announced it would be published up until the middle of the year due to the low number of subscribers. There is a notorious interruption of its publishing in 1820, probably due to Serva's death in August of the previous year. It began circulating again in 1821.

In 1822, during the Brazilian War of Independence, Idade d'Ouro do Brazil openly supported the Portuguese troops and severely criticized supporters of the Independence of Brazil. It criticized Hipólito da Costa's Correio Braziliense for changing his support for a unified Portuguese kingdom, and also its former patron Marcos de Noronha e Brito, who classified the periodical as an enemy of his. After the independence, it resisted the newly formed Empire up until the last issue, published on 24 June 1823.

== Content ==
=== Overview ===
Idade d'Ouro do Brazil's editorial line was conservative, publishing governmental acts and defending the interests of the Portuguese Crown, especially divulging news from the Captaincy of Bahia. It also published news of national interest, about commerce, science, arts and eventually agriculture, and published international news from merchant letters and translations from other periodicals. The last section was called "Aviso" (Notice), and published news about coming and going of ships, slave trade, merchant societies, merchant trades, etc. over the payment of 100 réis. The periodical had as its epigraph a poem of Sá de Miranda: "Falei em tudo verdades/ a quem em tudo as deveis" (Speak of everything truthfully/ to whom everything you owe). Each number ended with the phrase "with permission of the government". Its name is derived from a supposed golden age the State of Brazil was living brought by the transfer of the Portuguese court from Portugal. The periodical couldn't publish official releases of the Government, as it would be a direct breach of the monopoly held by Impressão Régia; thus it practiced more opinion journalism if compared with Gazeta do Rio de Janeiro.

The periodical followed several strict government guidelines created by Noronha e Brito, such as "always divulgate political news in the simplest form, simply advertising facts, without lodging any kind of reflections that tend, directly or indirectly, to give any inflections of public opinion". This is Brazil's first press manual. The periodical was under governmental censorship, with the "Aviso" section being reviewed only after 1819. The first reviewer was Noronha e Brito himself. In January 1812, he was substituted by José Francisco Cardoso. Later, the role was fulfilled by the Commission of Censorship.

=== Coverage ===
Idade d'Ouro do Brazil had a quarrel with liberal periodicals, especially Correio Braziliense, that have nicknamed it as Idade de Ferro (Iron Age) due to its conservative thesis. Among them was that slavery was unnecessary to the Kingdom of Portugal, but it was a necessary evil to the Kingdom of Brazil.

In 1817, it also took a long time to notify about the Pernambucan revolution, but when it did, the same was severely condemned. The periodical also published the execution of Padre Roma for being caught trying to spread the revolution in the Captaincy of Bahia, quickly spreading the news of his death to nearby captaincies and generating fear amongst the revolutionaries.

After the Revolution of Porto and the establishment of the Constituent Cortes of 1820, the periodical supported the creation of a constitution that would bring the Kingdom of Brazil back to the status of a colony. In 1822, it supported the Portuguese troops during the Brazilian War of Independence, affirming that Dom Pedro I was a rebel prince and the Portuguese troops in Bahia came to apply the Portuguese Constitution of 1822. After the Independence of Brazil, the periodical firmly resisted the newly formed Empire up until its last edition, lamenting the spilt Portuguese blood during the Independence of Bahia.

== Format and staff ==
As there was no qualified workforce, Serva had to quickly train his apprentices. He asked Dom João VI for help, who then dispensed his employees who wanted to take part in the profession to be trained. Serva's team was made out of one chief printer, one reviewer, six layout apprentices, four printers and one bookbinder. Some of the writers were the latin grammar teacher Gonçalo Vicente Portela, the philosophy teacher father Inácio José de Macedo and the Bachelor of Letters Diogo Soares da Silva de Bivar.

The periodical was four pages long and measured 17,5 x 10 cm. It was originally published on Tuesdays and Fridays. In 1921 it was published almost daily, excluding Sundays, but later it became biweekly. Its subscription costs 8$000 réis if done annually, 4$000 réis biannually or 2$400 réis quarterly. A single issue could be bought by 60 réis. Subscribers barely reached 200, and there was constant effort by the staff to find new ones. The initial press run was of around 200 copies.
