= Confederation of the Equator =

1824 rebellion in the Empire of Brazil

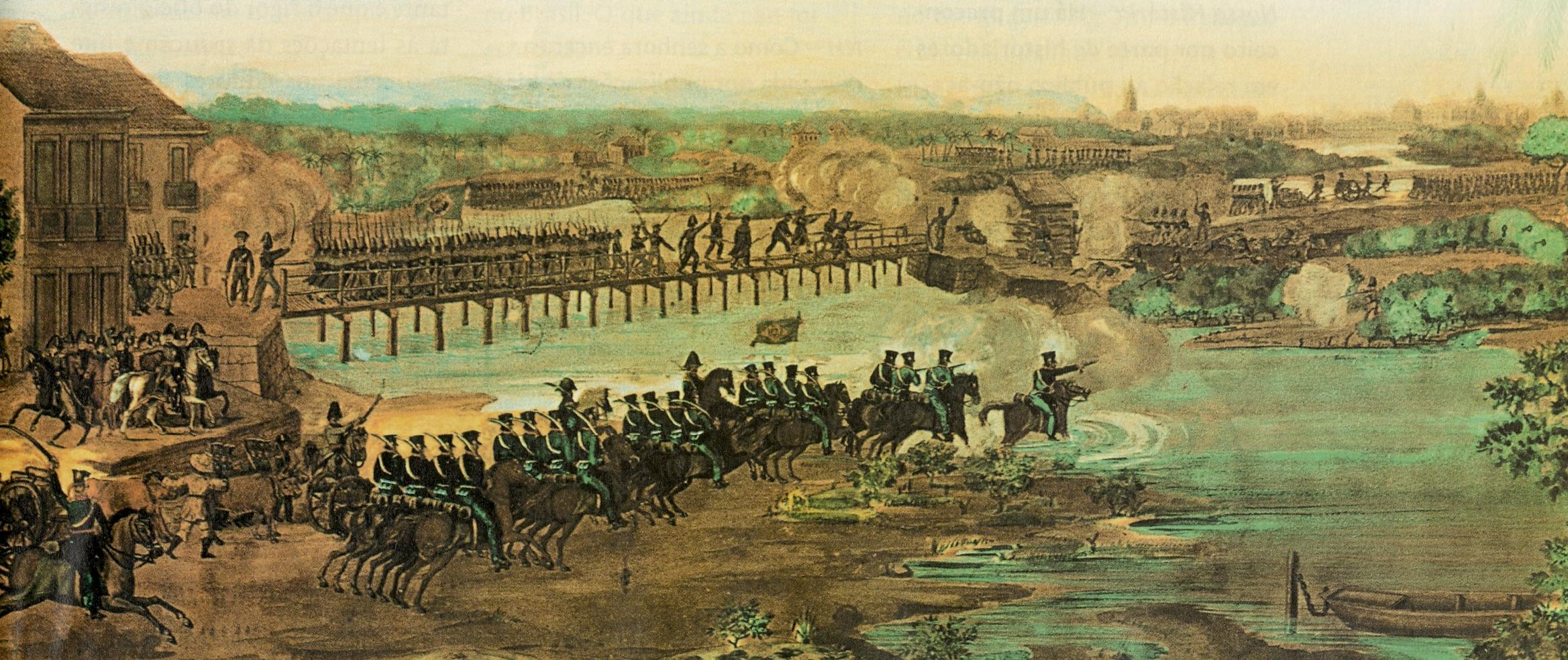
- The Brazilian Army fighting the Confederate troops in Recife, capital of the Pernambuco province, 1824.
Date	1824
Location	Pernambuco; Ceará; Paraíba
Result	Loyalist victory

Belligerents
Empire of Brazil	Confederation of the Equator

Commanders and leaders
(Empire of Brazil) Lima e Silva; (Empire of Brazil) John Taylor; (Empire of Brazil) Thomas Cochrane	Frei Caneca (executed); M. de Carvalho

Strength
Troops: In Pernambuco: 3,500; In Ceará: 2,200; In Paraíba: 2,000; Ships: In April: 2 frigates; 1 brig; 1 schooner; 1 charrua In August: 1 ship of the line; 1 brig; 1 corvette; 2 schooners	Unknown

Casualties and losses
Unknown	Unknown

The Confederation of the Equator (Portuguese: Confederação do Equador) was a short-lived rebellion that occurred in the northeastern region of the Empire of Brazil in 1824, in the early years of the country's independence from Portugal. The secessionist movement was led by liberals who opposed the authoritarian and centralist policies of the nation's first leader, Emperor Pedro I. The fight occurred in the provinces of Pernambuco, Ceará and Paraíba.

== Background ==
The dissolution of the Brazilian Constituent Assembly in 1823 was not well received in Pernambuco. The two greatest liberal leaders in the province, Manuel de Carvalho Pais de Andrade and Joaquim do Amor Divino Rabelo e Caneca, popularly known as "Frei Caneca" (Friar Caneca), supported it and blamed the Bonifacians for the act. Both, as well as other coreligionists, were republicans who participated in the revolt of 1817 and had been pardoned. They had accepted the monarchy for believing that at least there would be more autonomy for the provinces. The issuing of the Constitution in 1824, with its highly centralized regime, frustrated their desire. Pernambuco was divided between two political factions: a monarchist, led by Francisco Paes Barreto and another republican one, led by Manuel de Carvalho Pais de Andrade. The province was governed by Paes Barreto, who was appointed President by Pedro I, in accordance with the law promulgated by the Constituent Assembly on October 20, 1823 (and that would be later kept by the Constitution). On December 13, 1823, Paes Barreto resigned under the pressure of the Liberals that illegally elected in his place Paes de Andrade. Neither Pedro I nor the Government were informed of the election and requested the return of Paes Barreto to the office, something that was ignored by the Liberals.

In April 1824, a naval division led by Captain of Sea and War John Taylor was sent to blockade Recife. The squadron was composed of the frigates Nichteroy, commanded by Taylor, and Piranga, commanded by James Norton; the brig Bahia; the schooner Leopoldina and the charrua Gentil Americana. The Liberals vehemently refused to bring back Paes Barreto and boasted: “We shall die! Let Pernambuco be destroyed! There will be war!”. Frei Caneca, José da Natividade Saldanha and João Soares Lisboa (that had recently returned from Buenos Aires) were the intellectuals behind the rebellion and desired to preserve the interests of the gentry that they represented. Although Recife (or to be more precise, the Liberals) had clearly rebelled, Pedro I tried to prevent a conflict that he considered unnecessary and appointed a new president the province, José Carlos Mayrink da Silva Ferrão. Mayrink was natural of the province of Minas Gerais, but was related to the Liberals and it could act as a neutral entity to conciliate the two local factions. However, the Liberals did not accept Mayrink, which made him return to Rio de Janeiro. The rumors of a great Portuguese naval attack (Brazil was still in war for its independence) compelled John Taylor to leave Recife.

== The rebellion ==
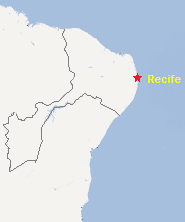
Possible map of the Confederation of Ecuador. In theory, the new republican state would be formed, in addition to Pernambuco, by the provinces of Piauí, Ceará, Rio Grande do Norte, Paraíba, Sergipe and Alagoas. However, none of them joined the revolt, with the exception of some towns in Paraíba and Ceará.

On July 2, 1824, only one day after the departure of Taylor, Manuel Paes de Andrade made use of the chance and announced the independence of Pernambuco. Paes de Andrade sent invitations to the others provinces of the north and northeast Brazil so that they could join Pernambuco and form the Confederation of the Equator. In thesis, the new republican State would be formed by the provinces of Grand Pará (current Amazonas, Roraima, Rondônia and Pará), Maranhão, Piauí, Ceará, Rio Grande do Norte, Alagoas, Sergipe, Paraíba, Pernambuco and Bahia. However, none of them adhered the secessionist revolt, with the exception of a few villages in southern Ceará and in Paraíba. However, in Ceará the situation became more serious with the deposition of the President Pedro José da Costa Barros, who was substituted by the confederate Tristão Gonçalves de Alencar Araripe. The other cities and villages of the province refused to accept the act and counterattacked. Alencar Araripe left to the countryside where he tried to defeat the legalist troops. While he was absent the capital of the province, Fortaleza, reaffirmed its loyalty to the Empire. In Pernambuco, Paes de Andrade could only count with Olinda, as the remaining of the province did not join the revolt. The confederate leader prepared his troops for the inevitable attack from the central Government and recruited by force even children and old men. Pedro I, after knowing of the secessionist revolt, spoke: “What are the demands of the insults from Pernambuco? Certainly a punishment, and such a punishment that it will serve as an example for the future”.

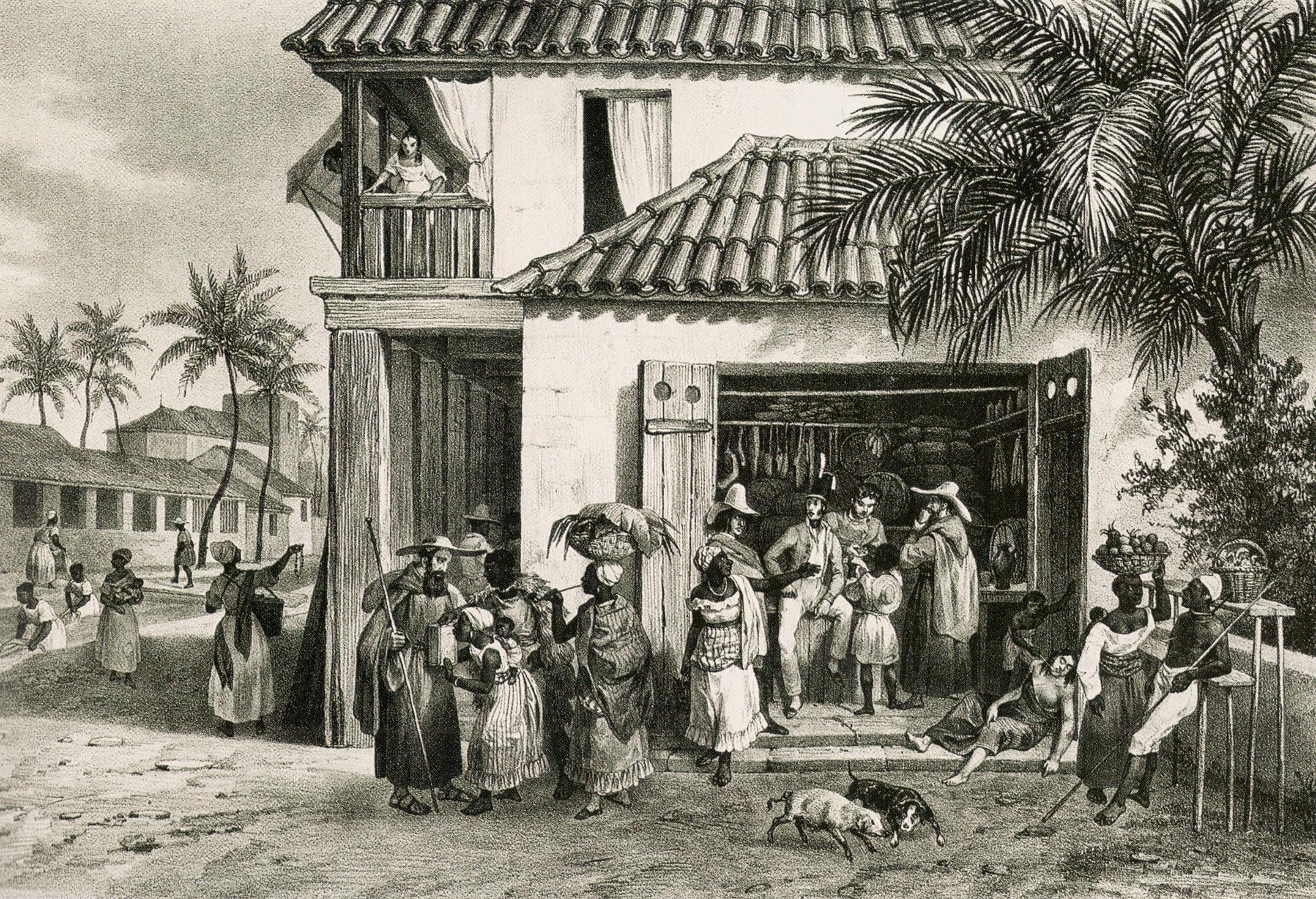
A street in Recife, capital of Pernambuco, 1820s.

Paes Barreto gathered himself troops to quell the revolt but was defeated which made him keep his forces in the countryside waiting for reinforcements. On August 2 the Emperor sent a naval division commanded by the Admiral Thomas Cochrane, composed of the ship of the line Pedro I, a brig, a corvette and two transports and also 1,200 soldiers led by Brigadier General Francisco de Lima e Silva. The troops landed in Maceió, capital of Alagoas, from where they travelled by land towards Pernambuco. The legalist forces soon met with Paes Barreto and his 400 men who joined the march. Throughout the way, the army was strengthened by militants that increased their numbers to 3,500 soldiers. Most of the population of Pernambuco, who lived in the countryside, including partisans of Paes Barreto and the neutral or indifferent to the disputes between both factions, remained faithful to the monarchy.

Meanwhile, Cochrane, who was already blockading Recife, tried to convince Paes de Andrade to surrender and thus prevent unnecessary deaths. Andrade refused the offer alleging that he preferred to die fighting “in the field of glory”. On September 12, the army led by Brigadier General Lima e Silva and Paes Barreto attacked Recife. Manuel Paes de Andrade, who had sworn that he would fight to death, ran away secretly with José da Natividade Saldanha without informing his companions and departed in a British ship. The rebels, without leadership and unmotivated, were completely defeated five days later in Olinda. A few led by Frei Caneca managed to escape towards Ceará. They believed that they would be able to join the confederates in that province. Few weeks later they were defeated by legalist troops. Some died, such as João Soares Lisboa and Alencar Araripe (murdered by his own men) while others were imprisoned, such as Frei Caneca. The rebels in Paraíba did not fare better and were quickly overwhelmed by troops of the province (each side had 2,000 men) without the aid of the central Government.

== Aftermath ==
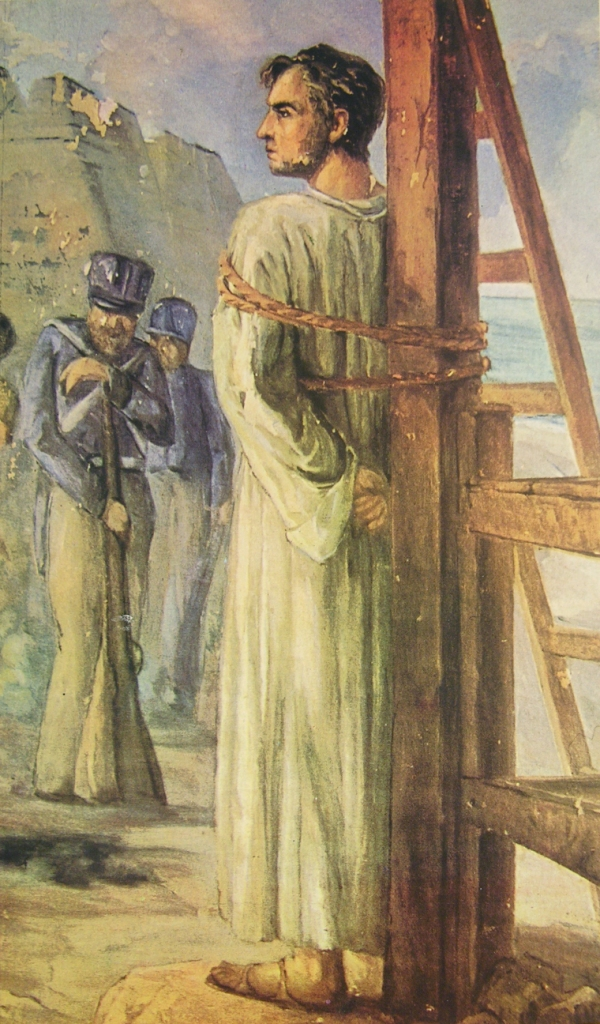
Execução de Frei Caneca, by Murillo La Greca, 1924

The legal persecution against the confederates initiated in October 1824 and lasted until April 1825. Of the hundreds who participated in the three provinces rebellion only sixteen were condemned to death, amongst them, Frei Caneca. Frei Caneca was sentenced to death by hanging, later changed to firing squad, "since he can not be hanged for disobedience of the executioners". He was executed on 13 January 1825, outside the walls of the Forte de São Tiago das Cinco Pontas. All the others were pardoned by Pedro I on March 7, 1825.

== Flag of the Confederation ==
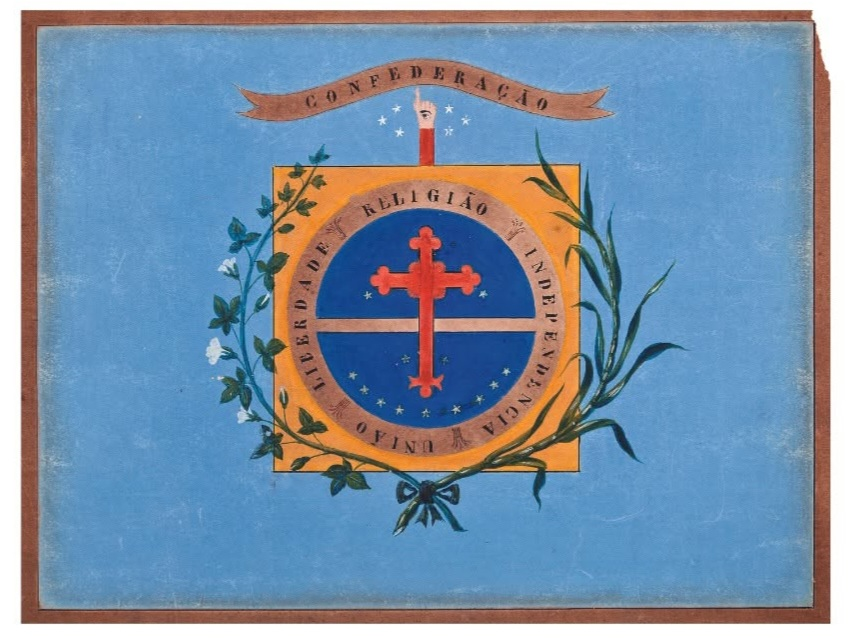
Original project for the flag of the Confederation of the Equator, watercolor, 1824

Based on contemporary accounts, the flag had a sky-blue field with the coat of arms of the separatist republic. The coat of arms consisted of a square yellow "shield" surrounded by branches of sugar cane and cotton. On the square was a white circle with the words "Religião, Independência, União, Liberdade" (religion, independence, union, liberty) separated by square bundles of rods, presumably the lictor's rods of the Roman fasces. On the center of the white circle was a smaller blue circle divided by a horizontal white stripe, and thereon a red cross bottony, which Ribeiro says the report incorrectly described as "floretty." Four white stars flanked the lower arm of the cross, two above the white stripe and two below. Nine more white stars were arranged in a semicircle at the bottom of the blue circle. Issuing from the top of the yellow square was a red staff ending in a hand with the eye of Providence on the palm, encircled by six more white stars. Finally, at the top of the flag, was a white scroll with the inscription Confederação (confederation).

== See also ==
- List of rebellions and revolutions in Brazil
- Military history of Brazil
- Pedro I of Brazil
- Politics of Pernambuco
