= Fernando José de Portugal e Castro =

Fernando José de Portugal e Castro, Marquis of Aguiar and viceroy of Brazil by an unknown author.

Fernando José de Portugal e Castro, Marquis of Aguiar (4 December 1752 – 24 January 1817) was a Portuguese politician who served, among other roles, as the first Secretary of State or Prime Minister of Brazil between 1808 and 1817. Previously, he had served as the penultimate Viceroy of Brazil from 1801 to 1806.

== Biography ==
Fernando José de Portugal e Castro was a younger son of José Miguel de Portugal e Castro, 3rd Marquis of Valença.

He earned a law degree from the University of Coimbra. After serving as a high court judge, he was appointed Governor and Captain-General of Bahia on 18 April 1788, and held this position until 23 September 1801. Subsequently, on 14 October 1801, he succeeded José Luís de Castro, 2nd Count of Resende, as Viceroy of Brazil, holding the office until 14 October 1806, when he was succeeded by Marcos de Noronha e Brito, 8th Count of Arcos. During this period, he also served as Governor of Rio de Janeiro.

He returned to Portugal in 1806, when he was chosen to preside over the Overseas Council. The following year, he was granted the title of Councilor of State. When the Portuguese Royal Family fled to Brazil because of the French invasion in 1808, Fernando José de Portugal e Castro accompanied them and became their first Secretary of State (Secretário de Estado dos Negócios do Reino) or Chief Minister on 10 March 1808. He held this post until his death on 24 January 1817, at which point António de Araújo e Azevedo, 1st Count of Barca succeeded him.

During his tenure, he also served as Minister of Finance (Ministro da Fazenda) and was raised to the nobility as Count of Aguiar by Queen Maria I on 17 December 1808. In December 1813, he was also elevated to the rank of Marquis of Aguiar and, from 1814 to 1816, simultaneously held the offices of Minister of Foreign Affairs (Ministro das Relações Exteriores) and Minister of War (Secretaria de Estado dos Negócios Guerra).

He married around 1809 his niece Maria Francisca de Portugal e Castro (1782–1835), but had no children.
He died in Rio de Janeiro on 24 January 1817.

Political offices
Preceded by José Luís de Castro	Viceroy of Brazil; 1801–1806	Succeeded by Marcos de Noronha e Brito
Preceded by Miguel Pereira Forjaz	Secretary of State of Portugal (Prime Minister); 1808–1817	Succeeded by António de Araújo e Azevedo
