= Evaldo Cabral de Mello =

Brazilian historian, history writer and diplomat

- Born: January 20, 1936 (age 90); Recife, Brazil
- Education: University of São Paulo
- Occupations: Historian, writer
- Spouse: Maria Luiza Cabral de Mello
- Relatives: João Cabral de Melo Neto (brother); Gilberto Freyre (cousin)
- Writing career
- Language: Portuguese
- Genre: non-fiction
- Subject: 17th Century Colonial Brazil
- Notable works: O Negócio do Brasil: Portugal, os Países Baixos e o Nordeste, 1641-1669
- Notable awards: National Order of Scientific Merit

Evaldo Cabral de Mello (born January 20, 1936) is a Brazilian historian, history writer and former diplomat, considered to be one of the most important Brazilian historians of the twentieth century.

== Biography ==
Evaldo Cabral de Mello was born in Recife on January 20, 1936 to Luís Antônio Cabral de Melo and Carmem Carneiro Leão Cabral de Melo. He is the younger brother of poet João Cabral de Melo Neto (1920–1999) and the cousin of sociologist Gilberto Freyre (1900–1987).

Cabral de Mello studied the philosophy of history in Madrid and London. Upon returning to Brazil he entered the diplomatic training institution Rio Branco Institute in 1960. Afterwards, Cabral de Mello worked as a diplomat for the Brazilian Ministry of Foreign Affairs from 1962 until his retirement.

In 1975, Cabral de Mello released his first book, Olinda restaurada: guerra e açúcar no Nordeste, 1630-1654. Since then he has written several books, including O negócio do Brasil: Portugal, os Países Baixos e o Nordeste, 1641-1669. In this book he showed that the Portuguese reconquest of Brazil from the Dutch was no military victory, but that a large sum of money was paid by Portugal to the Dutch Republic in exchange for Dutch Brazil.

In 1992, he was appointed Member of the Brazilian Order of Scientific Merit by the Brazilian government. In October 2014, he was appointed Member of the Brazilian Academy of Letters (chair 34).
