= Charrua (nautical) =

Charrua is a Portuguese nautical expression of the Age of Sail, initially used to designate the use of a frigate or a ship owned by the State as a transport vessel, reducing armament and complement, like the French nautical expression en flûte.

== Details ==
The charrua had large decks and big space for accommodation, and in sail terms it was not different from a ship, having three masts, and also a large hold. The charrua was intended for the transport of troops, food, ammunition, etc. In the first half of the 19th century, the expression passed to designate any type of ship used as a passenger ship.

== See also ==
- Glossary of nautical terms (A–L)
- En flûte
- En aventurier
