= Marcos de Noronha e Brito, 8th Count of Arcos =

Portuguese nobleman and colonial administrator

His Lordship The Count of Arcos ComC GCA
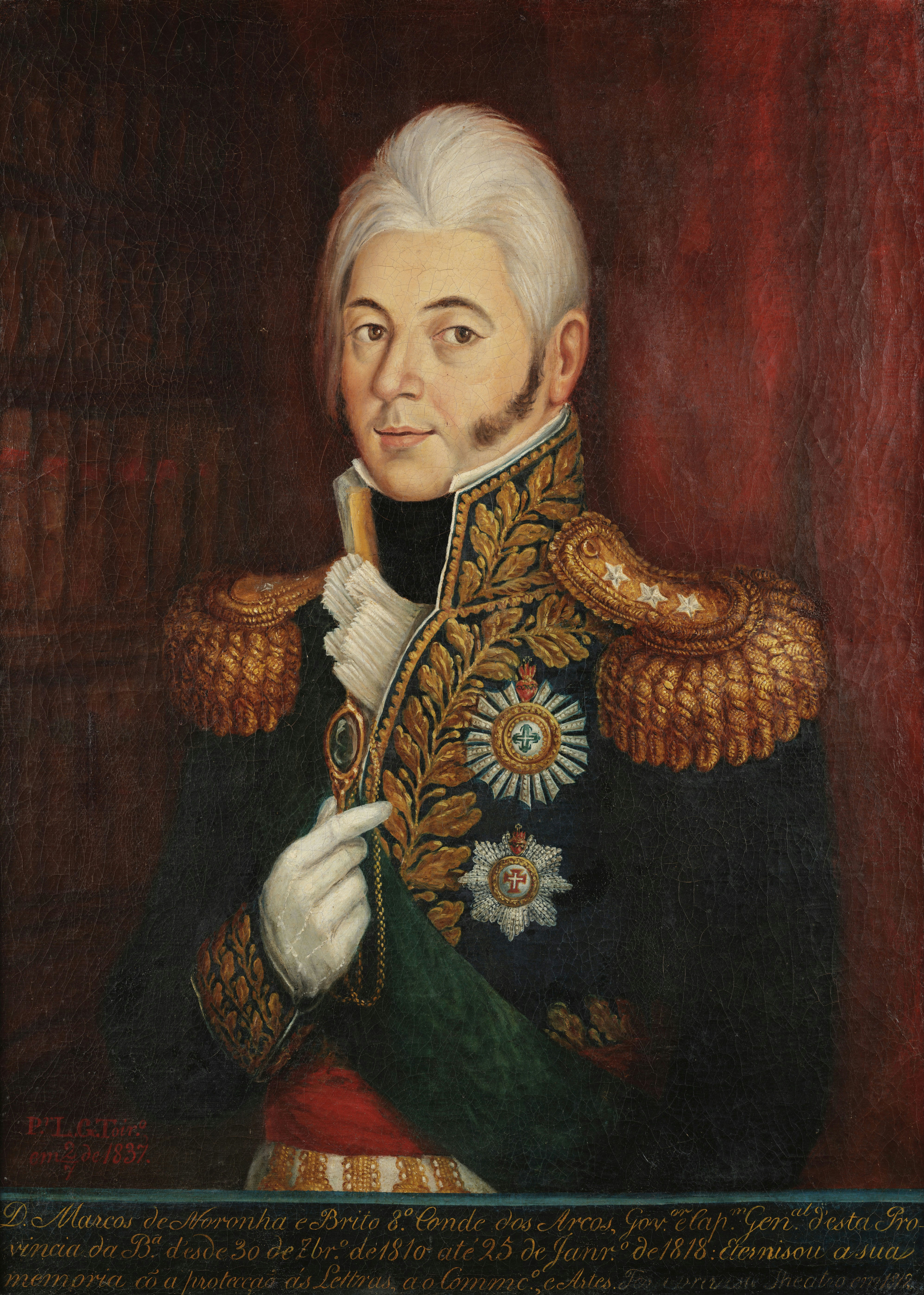
- Posthumous portrait by Luís Gomes Tourinho, 1837

Viceroy of Brazil
- In office 21 August 1806 – 22 January 1808
- Monarch: John VI of Portugal
- Preceded by: Fernando José de Portugal e Castro
- Succeeded by: Office abolished

Personal details
- Born: 7 July 1771 Lisbon, Kingdom of Portugal
- Died: 6 May 1828 (aged 56) Lisbon, Kingdom of Portugal

D. Marcos de Noronha e Brito, 8th Count of Arcos (7 July 1771 – 6 May 1828) was a Portuguese nobleman and colonial administrator who served as the last Viceroy of Brazil. He ruled from 21 August (or 14 October) 1806 to 22 January 1808, when Prince Regent John arrived in the city of Salvador, transferring the seat of the Portuguese monarchy to Brazil.

He had been sent to Brazil to occupy the position of governor and captain general of the provinces of Grão-Pará and Rio Negro. Called back to Rio de Janeiro, he replaced Fernando José de Portugal e Castro as viceroy of Brazil. In 1808, with the arrival of the Portuguese royal family in Brazil, he was transferred to Bahia as governor.

There he established the first printing press and printed the newspaper Idade d'Ouro do Brazil (Golden Age of Brazil), created the public library, completed the São João Theater and the customs wharf, in addition to installing a postal line to Maranhão.

During the Pernambuco revolt of 1817, he helped in the repression of rebels, some of whom were hanged.

Appointed Minister of the Navy and Overseas, he moved again to Rio de Janeiro. With the return of John VI to Portugal, he remained in Brazil, in charge of the affairs of the Kingdom and Foreigners portfolio, he was Minister of Affairs of the Kingdom of Brazil.

Soon after the Dia do Fico, emperor Pedro I fired him and sent him to Portugal, at the request of the troops, who could not stand the treatment he had given them.

His rule was characterized by the severe persecution of smugglers and an effort to clean up the administration of justice.

While alive, he was awarded the Grand Cross of the Order of St. Benedict of Aviz and of the Order of the Tower and Sword. He was commander of the Order of Our Lady of Conception of Vila Viçosa and commander of Santa Maria da Vila do Rei, in the Order of Christ.

== Biography ==
He began his military career as a cadet in the Cais Cavalry Regiment in November 1796, becoming a captain the following year.

=== Governor of Bahia ===
He assumed the government of Bahia in 1810, after the death of the Count of Ponte in 1809, ruling the captaincy for eight years (1810-1818) and was described as an energetic man, influenced by new ideas. The Count of Arcos was responsible for achievements in education. During his government, schools were created.

=== Education ===
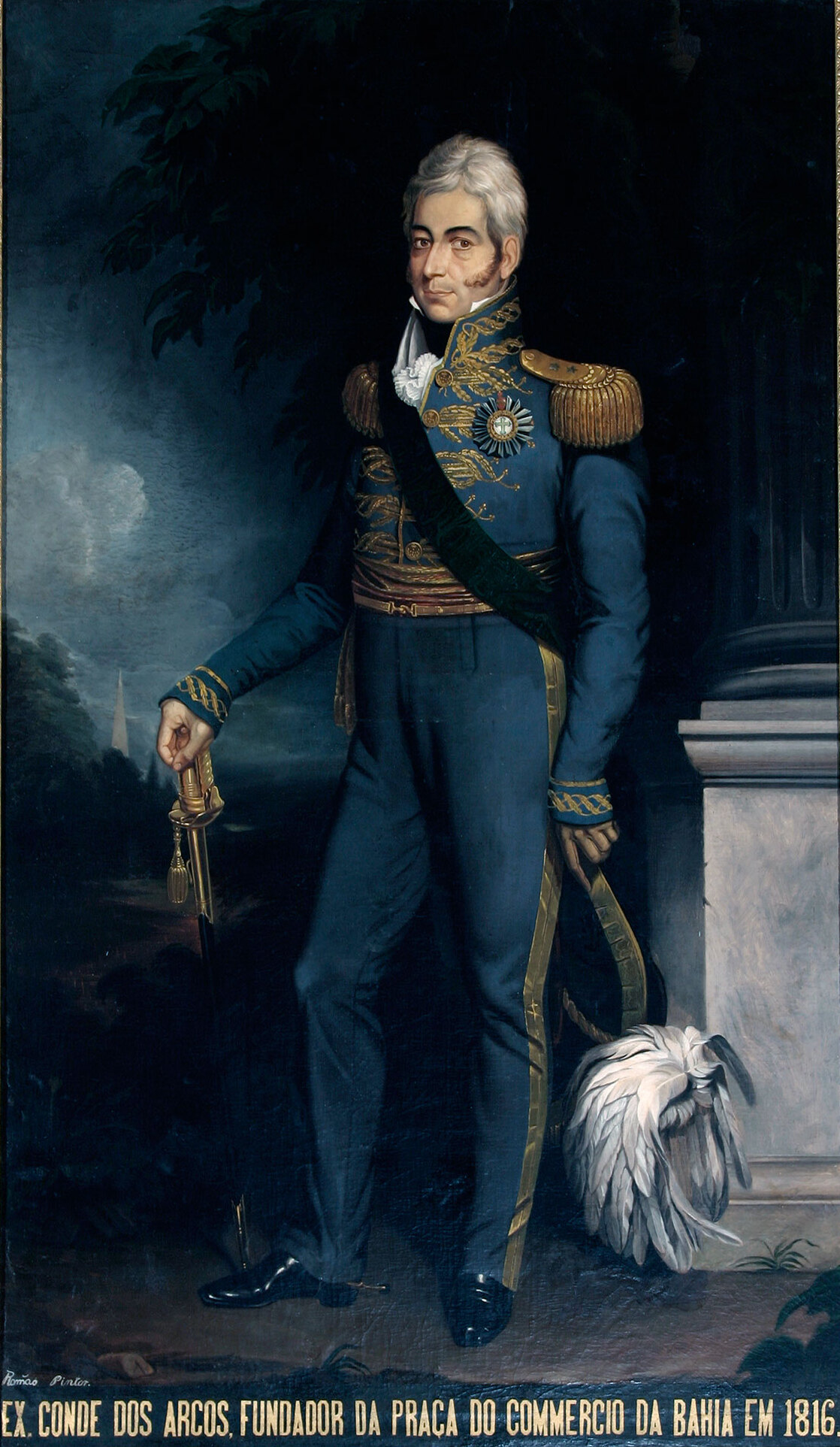
Posthumous portrait as founder of the Praça do Comércio by Francisco da Silva Romão, 1854

His period as governor was good for the education in Bahia. the Count of Arcos was responsible for creating schools and classes. In all, 25 chairs of literacy and 11 of Latin grammar were created. He also received authorization to open the Archepiscopal Seminary.

One of his first achievements in education was the creation of the commerce class, in 1810, the same year he assumed the government. In the commerce class, bookkeepers were trained and chairs of public instruction were created. A year later, on 15 July 1811, the Praça do Comércio was founded, which concentrated commercial and mercantile buildings. The idea was suggested by judge Brito and other men. The Praça de Comércio was the beginning of the Commercial Association of Bahia, which still exists today.

Another course created under his supervision was agriculture, due to the need of the captaincy. At the time, the captaincy of Bahia was the second most important in the country, thanks to its port, through which sugar and tobacco were exported. The course was created by an order of the Royal Court, through a royal charter dated 25 June 1812, so that the inhabitants could learn how to take care of the soil, as agriculture was a great source of the national income. The Court also established that the course should be similar to those given by the other captaincies. In the Agriculture course, the cultivation of plants used by amerindians, exotic or already known, was studied, such as hemp and linen. Mulberry trees and spices from Asia were also studied. Domingos Borges de Barros was the professor appointed for the course, as he had made many trips - including to the University of Coimbra, in Portugal - and gained knowledge in the area. He was also named director of the Botanical Gardens. Because of this, there was a great proximity between the agriculture classes and the Botanical Garden itself.

A year after the royal charter for the creation of the course, on 28 July 1813, a declaration with the indigenous medicinal products studied in each captaincy was requested, which the governors should attest to the quality and quantity of the products to be used to treat sick people at the Royal Military Court Hospital. The costs of extracting the products and who was trafficking them should also be reported. The information was passed on to the court through the Secretary of State for Foreign Affairs and War.

With the creation of the agriculture class, activities were developed in the area in addition to those requested by the Royal Court. An example was the work of Antônio Moniz de Souza, who was a recognized botanist at the time. In 1817, he traveled through the backlands of Bahia and brought exotic plants to the Count of Arcos. The plants were evaluated by the professor of theoretical chemistry Sebastião Navarro de Andrade, a course created in 1817 at the Colégio Médico-Cirúrgico. With proof that the discoveries were valuable, the Count of Arcos called Moniz de Souza, offering his protection so that the botanist could go to Europe to study natural history and bring his observations back with him.

A drawing class was also created, which was administered by the governor himself.

Music classes were created by the Count of Palma, the governor who succeeded the Count of Arcos, on 30 March 1818. At the time, although the captaincy was no longer under his jurisdiction, the Count attested to the need to create the class due to "the decay of teaching".

=== Creation of the public library ===
On 13 May 1811, Noronha e Brito founded the Public Library of Bahia. The initiative came from Pedro Gomes Ferrão Castelo Branco, Alexandre Gomes Ferrão and Francisco Agostinho Gomes, who were used to reading books from France on philosophy and politics in Masonic clubs. Enlightenment ideas were discussed. For the creation of the library, colonel Pedro Gomes Ferrão Castelo Branco presented an administrative plan for the institution. The plan was approved by the Count of Arcos and the library was established. It was the first public library created in Brazil, as those existing in convents until then were private and the Royal Library of Rio de Janeiro was created in Lisbon and had its headquarters transferred to Rio de Janeiro.

When the library opened, there were donations of books, including from the governor himself. However, the copies of the Count of Arcos were only borrowed, as he withdrew his books when the library moved to the cathedral. In 1817, when the Count of Arcos was about to leave the government of Bahia, the library began to lose the attention and care it had at first.

=== Press ===
In addition to improvements in education, there was the development of the press. The Idade d'Ouro do Brazil was the first newspaper printed in Bahia, approved by the prince regent and the Count of Arcos. The first edition was printed on 14 May 1811.

Upon seeing the first publication, the governor tried to establish rules for the press. In the ordinance of 5 May 1811, the Count of Arcos established that newspaper editors should tell political news in a simple way, announcing the facts without bringing reflections that could directly or indirectly influence public opinion. At the time, the press had a doctrinal character. The Count of Arcos attested that:

"Whenever the scarcity of news leaves a space available on the sheet, it shall be occupied by publishing some useful discovery, particularly, for the time being, in the Arts, discussing the need to institute and preserve good and polite customs in the nations and explaining not only how the national character gains consideration in the world by adhering to its government and religion, but getting into the mess, or showing with grace and aplomb, how much has been lost in that regard by all the nations that allow themselves to be detached from the government and religion of their fathers".

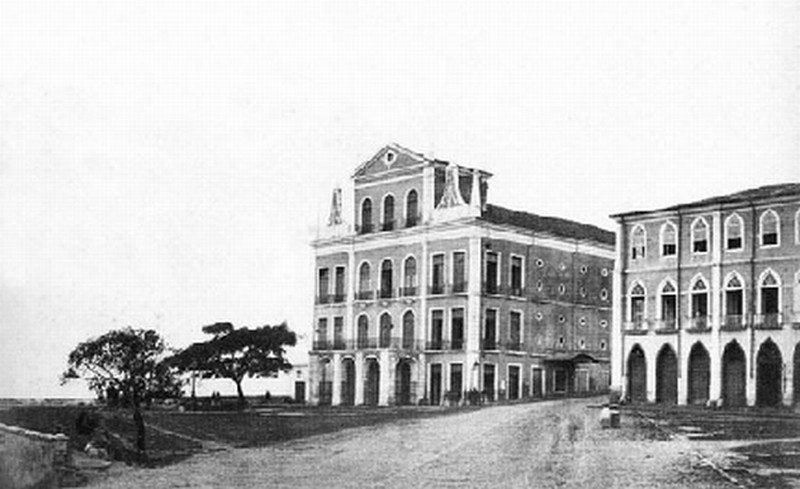
The São João theater, demolished in 1923.

=== São João theater ===
The construction of the São João theater was initiated in 1806, during the government of the Count of Ponte (1805-1810), predecessor of the Count of Arcos. However, it was only completed during the government of the Count of Arcos. At the time, it was noticed that the theater's shareholders' contribution was not sufficient to pay for the expenses, and the collection of the lottery was instituted. The royal charter of 27 January 1809 established that all lottery income should be transformed into benefits for the theater itself for a period of six years. In January 1811, the Count of Arcos was responsible for receiving the lottery income. Lotteries started to be advertised in the newspaper Idade d'Ouro do Brazil.

== Slavery ==
Noronha e Brito believed that slave masters were too strict and petty for punishing their slaves with unnecessary rigor, forcing them to work too much, feeding them poorly, and giving them minimal leisure. For him, slaves were "uneasy" due to mistreatment. Therefore, he encouraged the festivities held by slaves, unlike their masters. The Count of Arcos chose to deal with slaves through deterrence. In his view, when the slaves practiced their religions, they would come into conflict with each other, since the African ethnic plurality was enormous, which was also reflected in Brazil. He believed this to be a better option than inducing the practice of Christianity among them, as that could lead to unity and possibly rebellions. The Count of Arcos also believed that slavery was a necessary evil that could be alleviated by making it more bearable for the slaves.

In some cases, the Count encouraged disagreements among African peoples. He supported the jejê-nagô brotherhood of Barroquinha and the brotherhood of the Martírios, causing discord with the Angolan brotherhood Nossa Senhora do Rosário dos Pretos, which was prominent among them. His goal was to exploit existing rivalries to prevent them all from uniting against the government.

It was with his support that the brotherhood of Barroquinha managed to build a noble hall attached to its temple. The temple also gained more equipment and increased in size. The meetings, which were prohibited by the previous governor, the Count of Ponte, became legal by the Count of Arcos and, therefore, had a substantial improvement even in their structures.

His policy in dealing with slavery displeased the local nobles. They wrote a letter to the king to demonstrate their displeasures. During his rule, there were at least three slave revolts in the captaincy. In the letter, they mentioned that the rebels had achieved the union of various ethnic groups, contrary to the Count's policy that the free practice of their customs would separate them. They commented that the uprisings were violent, noting that 150 houses were burned by the rebels and more than 50 people were killed. They also asserted that slaves could not be treated well, as "fear and punishment are the only means of doing them well".

The Count of Arcos paid little attention to the nobles. For him, the masters' fear and discontent was based on the very remorse they felt for daily mistreating their slaves. With this, the nobles held a meeting with the aim of removing Marcos de Noronha from power. Despite the support of the Military Commander of Bahia, brigadier Felisberto Caldeira Brant, future Marquis of Barbacena, the nobles were not prepared to carry out a coup d'état. Brant proved to be a strong opponent of the Conde of Arcos on the slave issue, as he wrote to the court in Rio de Janeiro that the governor should change his guidelines and ban slave parties, which were known as batuques. He claimed that the Count of Arcos seemed unable to "write or say a syllable against blacks". His discontent reached the level of personally going to Rio de Janeiro, seat of the court, to protest in favor of the slave owners in Bahia. There he obtained an order from the government with basic measures for the treatment of slaves. When Brant returned to Bahia, the Count of Arcos imprisoned him for a few days because of his audacity. Afterwards, the two reconciled to fight the Pernambuco Revolt of 1817, which demanded the independence of Brazil.

His approach was peaceful so that the slaves would not rebel, but when they did they were harshly repressed. In one of the revolts that took place in the captaincy, four slaves were sentenced to death, others sentenced to public floggings, and 23 men - probably freed slaves - were deported to Angola, to the Portuguese port of Benguela. More than 20 slaves died in prisons from mistreatment.

== Pernambuco Revolt of 1817 ==
When Noronha learned of the revolt taking place in the captaincy of Pernambuco, he did not wait for the king's order to organize the repression. He sent troops to Pernambuco by land and sea. On 16 April 1817, it was possible to see a brig and two corvettes arriving to blockade Recife. By the end of the month, the brig and the corvettes joined a warship that came from Rio de Janeiro.

As in the rebellion of the slaves, the Count of Arcos reacted to the revolt with violence. One of the rebel leaders, José Inácio Ribeiro de Abreu e Lima, which was known as father Roma, went to Bahia to persuade the captaincy to join the revolt. When he arrived in Bahia, he was immediately arrested and sentenced to death by firing squad on the orders of the governor. The judgment was quick, done verbally. The surprised even some government officials. The Minister of the Kingdom, Tomás António de Vila Nova Portugal, disapproved of the procedure and ordered the Count of Arcos to stop executing rebels "without the guarantees of the law".

When it became clear that the rebels had lost and there was no chance of escape, father João Ribeiro Pessoa de Melo Montenegro, one of the rebel leaders, chose to commit suicide. His body was exhumed and displayed in a public square. Other leaders such as Domingos José Martins, José Luís de Mendonça and father Miguelinho were arrested in Bahia and sentenced to death by the governor.

== Ministry of navy and overseas ==
=== Count of Arcos palace ===
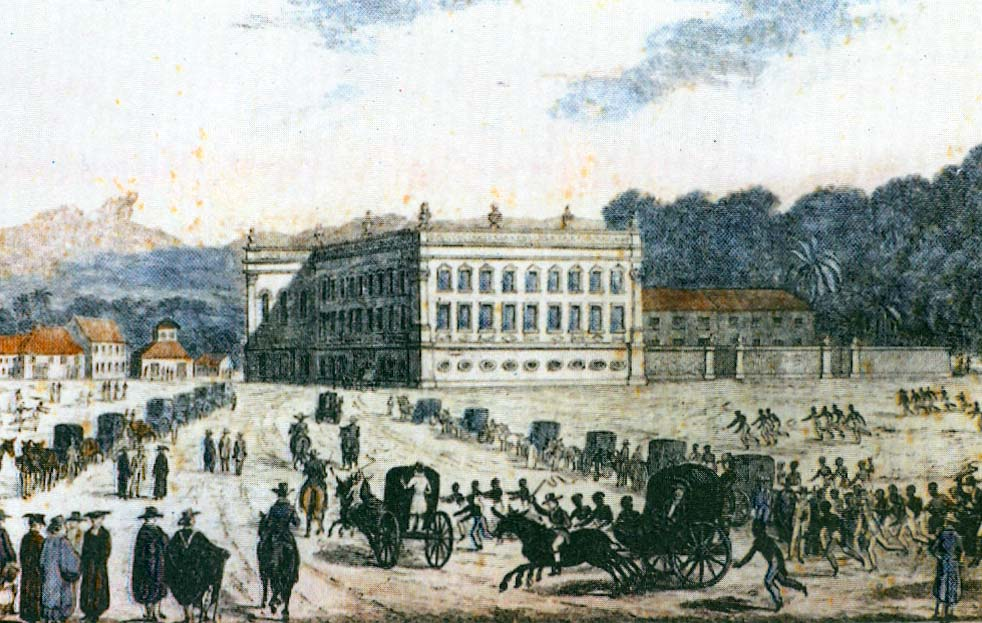
The palace in 1829.

After losing the title of viceroy when the royal family came to Brazil, Marcos de Noronha e Brito did not lose his influence in the government. In addition to having received the Portuguese royal family in the country, he was appointed Minister of the Navy and Overseas in July 1817 by king John VI. He assumed the position in February 1818 and stayed in Rio de Janeiro. Due to his prestige, a residence was built for him - the Count of Arcos Palace. When he was removed from office in 1821, the property became vacant and in 1824 it was bought by the emperor Pedro I to become the seat of the Imperial Senate. The palace served as the seat of the Senate until 1925.

=== Work in the practical-chemical laboratory ===
During his years as Minister of the Navy and Overseas, the count became director of the Practical-Chemical Laboratory. However, when the activities already carried out at the Laboratory were presented, the Count of Arcos said that it was not a priority. He was introduced to the laboratory by Francisco Vieira Goulart as soon as he took office.

The Laboratory was one of the first initiatives in the country to work with chemistry. There, chemical researches were carried out for commercial purposes. The first product evaluated by the laboratory was brazilwood. The preparation of opium and the purification of sugarcane spirit were also studied. Under the direction of the Count of Arcos, the laboratory faced the difficulty of looking for a new headquarter. Goulart later found a new building to be the headquarters of the laboratory, but when he received the request in December 1818, he stated that he had no money to invest and would not request it from the King. On 22 December 1819, the laboratory was dissolved.

=== Imprisonment decree ===
With the typical communication difficulties of the time, news of arrests spread slowly. Furthermore, there was little or no control over arbitrary imprisonments, and few police and judges to carry out trials. Noting this situation, the Count of Arcos issued a decree on 23 May 1821 that aimed to regulate the imprisonments and living conditions of prisoners. In his words, the justification for the decree was:

"As I understand that some governors, criminal judges and magistrates, violating the sacred deposit of jurisdiction entrusted to them, send orders of imprisonments by mere discretion and before formed guilt, pretexting secret denunciations, vehement suspicions and other reasons horrific to humanity, to keep in dungeons with total impunity, bent with iron weights, men who congregated for the goods that the institution of Civil Societies had offered them, the first of which is undoubtedly individual security. And it being my first duty and carrying out my word to promote the most austere respect for the law and to anticipate as much as possible the benefits of a liberal Constitution: I shall for good stimulate in the most effective and rigorous way the observance of the aforementioned legislation, expanding it and ordaining, as by this decree I command..."

The decree contained five articles. The first attested that people could only be arrested with a written court order, except in flagrante delicto. The second article attested to the conditions under which a judge could issue arrest warrants: guilt confirmed by three witnesses, two of them sworn; the fact being a crime exposed by law; description of the accused; a court decision determining the arrest and release. The third article provided a non-extendable period of 48 hours for the conviction or acquittal. The entire process should be public, with authorization for defendants and witnesses to be confronted if necessary. The decree made self-defense legal in crimes that did not carry the death penalty. Regarding living conditions in prisons, the Count prohibited in the decree:

[...] "may someone be thrown into a secret or narrow, dark or infective dungeon, as the prison should only serve to guard people and never to make them sick, and to flagellate, the use of chains, handcuffs, shackles and other devices like irons invented to martyr men not yet judged to suffer any excruciating penalty for a final sentence is now forever implicitly abolished".

The last article threatened the fulfillment of all previous articles by governors. Anyone who disobeyed any article would lose public employment and be permanently banned from public service.

== Bibliography ==
- Oliveira, José Teixeira de (2002). Dicionário brasileiro de datas históricas (in Portuguese). Petrópolis: Vozes.
