= Dr. Gama =

Doutor Gama
- Theatrical release poster
- Directed by: Jeferson De
- Written by: Luiz Antonio
- Produced by: Pedro Betti; Heitor Dhalia; Egisto Betti; Manoel Rangel
- Starring: César Mello; Ângelo Fernandes; Pedro Guilherme; Mariana Nunes; Isabél Zuaa
- Production companies: Buda Filmes; Globo Filmes; Paranoid Filmes
- Distributed by: Elo Company
- Release date: 5 August 2021
- Running time: 92 minutes
- Country: Brazil
- Language: Portuguese

Dr. Gama (Portuguese: Doutor Gama) is a 2021 Brazilian biographical drama film directed by Jeferson De and produced by Paranoid Filmes, with Globo Filmes and Buda Filmes as associate producers. With script by Luiz Antonio, it tells the story of journalist, poet, and jurist Luís Gama and is starred by César Mello, Ângelo Fernandes, and Pedro Guilherme who play the same character in three different phases. Mariana Nunes and Samira Carvalho play Claudina Fortunato, Luiz Gama's wife in two different phases, and the film also features the talents of Romeu Evaristo, Teka Romualdo, Sidney Santiago, Dani Ornellas, Alan Rocha, Erom Cordeiro, Johnny Massaro, Higor Campagnaro, and Isabél Zuaa.

== Synopsis ==
Based on the life of the abolitionist lawyer and writer Luís Gama, one of the most important figures in Brazilian history. Born free, Luís Gama was sold at the age of 10 as a slave in order to pay his father's debts. Even with the life of an enslaved man, he studied and managed to become literate, conquering his own freedom. He became one of the most respected lawyers and thinkers of his time and inspired the whole country with his ideals, texts, and speeches.

The closing credits show the message Black Lives Matter.

== Cast ==
Source: Globo Filmes
Actor/Actress	Character
César Mello	Luís Gonzaga Pinto da Gama
Ângelo Fernandes	Luís Gonzaga Pinto da Gama
Pedro Guilherme	Luís Gonzaga Pinto da Gama
Mariana Nunes	Claudina Fortunata Gama
Samira Carvalho	Claudina Fortunata Gama
Isabél Zuaa	Luísa Mahin
Romeu Evaristo	Santos
Teka Romualdo	Ana
Higor Campagnaro	Dr. Antônio Carlos
Johnny Massaro	Dr. Antônio Carlos
Erom Cordeiro	Pedro
Daniel Rocha	Pedro
Agyei Augusto	Benedito Graco Pinto da Gama
Dani Ornellas	Maria Julia
Alan Rocha	Francisco
Sidney Santiago	José
Zezé Motta	Francisca
Noemia Oliveira	Bárbara
Fernanda Ross	Maria
Nelson Baskerville	Cardoso
Paula Picarelli	Laura
Joca Andreazza	Judge Britto
Régius Brandão	Judge Rios
Clara Choveux	Thereza

== Development ==
The film, which originally had the name Prisioneiro da Liberdade and starred Fabrício Boliveira, was co-produced by Globo Filmes and Paranoid, with associate production by Buda Filmes and distribution by Elo Company and had to recreate the São Paulo and Salvador regions of the 19th century having to shoot in Paraty, a colonial-era town whose architecture has been greatly preserved, where the team had to adapt the set in order to recreate the cities of the time.

With the objective of telling the leading role of the character in just 90 minutes, the team sought historical research support and advice in all departments of the project. Historian Lígia Fonseca Ferreira, who researches Gama's work, served as a consultant for the film.

The script was written by Luiz Antônio and director Jeferson De received the first version already in 2014, recalling that: "This is the story I would like to tell..." and that in Brazilian cinema, "...about Luiz Gama no one had looked into it." The trial dramatized in the film did not take place, but was based on other cases Gama worked with. The actor César Mello, spent a long time reading out loud Luiz Gama's texts, in order to perfect his oratory and the work is divided into three stages: childhood, adolescence, and the adult life of the title character.

== Release ==
In June 2021, it was announced that the film would be released on July 29, 2021 in Brazilian theaters distributed by Elo Company. However, it was released in theaters on August 5 and arrived on Globoplay on August 14, 2021. The work has been selected to participate in the American Black Film Festival in November 2021.

Pedro Henrique Ribeiro at Omelete gave it a score of 4 out of 5 noting that the "main highlight in the narrative is the choice not to spectacularize black suffering to tell Gama's story..." something also recognized by Cadu Costa, from Ultraverso, who furthermore recalls the pioneering spirit of Esperança Garcia, considered the first female lawyer in Brazil, around 1770, while explaining that Gama's visibility came by using the laws of the slave society itself to his advantage. Papo de Cinema criticizes the film's choice of a linear narrative, focusing on moments that were not important later on, something that the critic at the Casa do Cinema Brasileiro disagree, saying that the director was careful and only presents the essentials so that the audience can understand the character and the Guia Negro website says that: "It's the black Brazilian hero movie that black people have longed for, without exotification, subalternity or any of the other stereotypes that white people usually give us." Matheus Mans, from Esquina da Cultura, recognizes the historical importance of the work, but notes that the film could have risked more in its narrative.
