= Um Defeito de Cor =

2006 Brazilian novel

- Author: Ana Maria Gonçalves
- Language: Portuguese
- Published: Record
- Publication date: 2006
- Publication place: Brazil
- Pages: 952
- ISBN: 9788501071750

Um Defeito de Cor is a Brazilian historical novel, published by Ana Maria Gonçalves in 2006.

The novel has received widespread critical acclaim, being praised for changing the conversation on Black history in Brazil. The novel was adapted as a Samba, becoming the topic of the presentation made by Portela (samba school) in the Rio Carnival.

== Plot ==
The novel starts with a short prologue, saying how the narrator got ahold of a 19th century manuscript, found in Itaparica Island. The rest of the novel is structured as a long letter written by main character Kehinde, and addressed to her son.

In the first chapter, the protagonist Kehinde tells about how her village in Savalou, located in what is now Benin, was attacked, and her mother was raped and killed. Kehinde, her twin sister Taiwo, and their grandmother eventually find a new place to stay in the coastal town Ouidah, where the two girls are captured to be shipped off as slaves. Her grandmother voluntarily goes on the ship so that she can stay with her granddaughters. Both Kehinde's grandmother and her twin sister die during the crossing.

They arrive in Salvador, Bahia, where Kehinde manages to hide when they are performing forced baptisms. She does however pick a Christian name for herself, Luisa. Kehinde is quickly sold to plantation owner Jose Carlos of Itaparica Island to serve as a playmate for his daughter Maria Clara. There she lives among the other domestic slaves and learns Portuguese. Since she accompanies Maria Clara during her lessons, Kehinde also learns how to read and write. After Maria Clara is sent to boarding school, Kehinde loses her job as a house slave and from then on has to work on the sugar cane plantation.

When Kehinde enters puberty, and her owner Jose Carlos begins to take a sexual interest in her. He orders her back to the mansion so he can get closer to her. After some failed advances, the plantation owner rapes her. Kehinde becomes pregnant, and Jose Carlos dies of a snake bite a short time later. The plantation owner's now widowed wife, Ana Felipa, gives up the plantation and moves to Salvador with her domestic slaves, including pregnant Kehinde.

During the trip, Kehinde gives birth to her first son. She baptizes the child in the Yoruba tradition, which displeases Ana Felipa. As punishment, Kehinde is loaned by her mistress to an English family to serve as a playmate for their daughters and to kept away from her son. There she learns English. During a secret nighttime visit to her son, she is discovered by the police and is no longer allowed to stay with the English family. She comes back to Ana Felipa's house. Both the women fall in love with the same man, enslaved in the house, and for that reason Ana Felipa decides Kehinde should work as a "rent slave", a slave that works by themselves, usually as a street seller, living outside of the main house, and give a portion of their earnings to their owners. Kehinde starts selling cookies using a recipe she learned from the English family.

During this activity, Kehinde meets the Portuguese nobleman Alberto, with whom she begins a relationship. When the mistress decides to move to Rio de Janeiro, Kehinde desperately tries to buy her and her son's freedom, but the money she earned from selling cookies isn't enough. By a happy coincidence, she stumbles upon a small fortune and, working with many of her acquaintances, she is able to gain her son's freedom, her own, and even that of some friends.

She moves with her son and Alberto to a country estate near Salvador, where she suffers a miscarriage and then becomes pregnant again. They are expanding the well-running cookie business by building their own bakery in the city. Alberto also buys a townhouse, which the community will soon move into. Despite the birth of their son, the relationship with Alberto deteriorates noticeably. He wants to marry another white woman, whereupon they separate and divide their possessions. Kehinde is able to keep part of the bakery, but has to give up production and sales and moves into the back building of the former bakery.

The front building is rented to Muslim friends and soon becomes an important meeting place for Muslims, who plan parts of a revolt from there. Kehinde's firstborn son dies in an accident. Kehinde builds a tobacco business as a new source of income and becomes more and more involved in Muslims' uprising plans. She finally takes part in the revolt, has to go into complete hiding for a few days and can only return home with the help of her acquaintances. Due to the heated social and political situation, Kehinde cannot remain in Salvador and, leaving her son with Alberto with him, goes into temporary exile on the island of Itaparica.

There she approaches the religion of her ancestors again and travels to Maranhao to reunite with well-known personalities of Afro-Brazilian culture, among others Na Agontime, to then return to Itaparica and there as a novice. While she is away, Alberto sells their son to pay off his gambling debts, hiding the papers that proved that the boy was free. When she finds out about this, she goes looking for her son, determined to free him. The search takes her first to Rio de Janeiro, where she spends a few months, then to Sao Paulo and Campinas.

Finally, without success, she returns to Salvador and decides to travel to Africa to possibly find her son there. Back in the seaside town of Uida, she forms a family with the black Englishman John, whom she met on the crossing, and gives birth to twins: Maria Clara and João. Through trade between Brazil and Africa and later founding her own construction company, she earns a lot of money and rises quickly in society. It is well integrated into the high society of African society and is internationally networked. The search for her son has come to a standstill due to the hopelessness. It only regularly publishes newspaper advertisements in major Brazilian cities. After a few years, her relationship with John cools down. He ultimately dies of an injury.

At the age of 53, Kehinde decides to relocate to Lagos. The trading business has come to a standstill due to changing political circumstances and deceased trading partners. However, the construction business still exists. She sends the twins to study in Europe and when they return they start their own families. Kehinde slowly goes blind, but by chance she finds old unopened letters revealing the whereabouts of her prodigal son, after which she decides to travel back to Brazil to reunite with him. On the crossing, in 1899, with her last strength, she dictates this report.

== Historical Background ==
=== Inspiration in the life of Luisa Mahin ===
The plot of Um Defeito de Cor is inspired by the history of Brazilian abolitionist lawyer Luís Gama. He was born of a free black mother and a Portuguese nobleman father, and therefore was born free. He was, however, sold by his own father as a slave to pay for his gambling debts. He judicially won his own freedom and began to work as a lawyer on behalf of the captives. A 2019 law has recognized his role by declaring him the patron of abolition in Brazil.

Very little information is known about Gama's childhood, except from his all memories. He claimed that his mother was born in Africa and captured and enslaved in Brazil, that her name was Luísa Mahin, who had managed to avoid being baptised and who participated in the Malê revolt. He later attempted to find out more about her later life, hearing from acquaintances she had moved to Maranhao, participated in the Sabinada revolt, and been deported to Africa as a result.

Since most of the information about Luisa comes from his memoirs, and that he had not seen his mother since he was a 10 year old child, the facts of her life and even whether or not she existed remain controversial in Brazilian historiography. Nowadays, she has become more recognizes as historiography recognized oral tradition as a legitimate source. In 2019, Mahin's name was officially written in the Brazilian book of National Heroes.

=== The Malê revolt ===
Malê revolt was the largest slave rebellion in Brazilian history. It took place in 1835, in Salvador. The revolt was largely organized by Muslim enslaved people, called imale in yoruba language. Islam has been spread by former slaves in Salvador, with the opening of private mosques. Most of the converted would be taught a bit of spoken and written Arabic. The ability to send notes in Arabic was fundamental in the planning of the rebellion.

The revolt started in January 24, after news of a possible rebellion reached authorities. It met with brutal repression, and it was quickly suffocated. After the revolt, and fearing the spread of the ideas of the Haitian Revolution, the Brazilian government quickly sentenced four of the rebels to death, sixteen to prison, eight free men to being reenslaved, and forty-five to flogging. About two hundred participants were deported to Benin, forming a lusophone community there, something that is also depicted in the novel, and developed further below.

=== Sabinada ===
Sabinada was a separatist insurrection in Brazil, which took place between 6 November 1837 and 16 March 1838. The insurrection was based on mistrust of the imperial regent, Dom Feijo, and proposed that the region of Bahia should be independent in a transitory base, until emperor Pedro II reached adulthood. The rebels also proposed abolition of slavery and redistribution of land. They managed to briefly take the city of Salvador, before meeting repression from the authorities.

=== Brazilian diaspora in Africa ===
People enslaved in Brazil would often move to Africa, either willingly after gaining manumission, or after being deported. Freed enslaved people born in Africa were often considered as illegal aliens, and deported to Africa. There was no real attempt to discover of which part of the continent they had come from, and most people were just deported to Benin and Nigeria. This practice eventually formed lusophone communities in these countries, later known as the Amaros or Agudas, a term which also included those formerly enslaved in Cuba. Even though people in these communities were born in Africa, many had been in Brazil since childhood, spoke Portuguese, and brought with them Afro-Brazilian sensibilities in food, agriculture, architecture and religion. One of the largest cultural influences of the period was the popularization of Cassava as a crop.

== Reception ==
Um Defeito de Cor received widespread critical acclaim. Critics have pointed out the centrality of an enslaved woman in the narrative, who, in spite of abuses, is a fully developed character, and the novel's role in the recognition of black history in Brazil.

Fellow writer Millôr Fernandes considered it the most important work published in Brazil in the XXI century, and it won prestigious awards such as the Casa de las Américas Prize. The novel reached 7th position in the list "200 most important books to understand Brazil", made by newspaper Folha de S.Paulo. Gonçalves was also awarded the Order of Rio Branco medal by the Brazilian government for her service to anti-racism, and became the first Black woman elected to the Brazilian Academy of Letters.

== Samba adaptation ==
The novel was adapted as a Samba, becoming the topic of the presentation made by Portela samba school in the Rio Carnival in 2024. The lyrics were composed by Antônio Gonzaga and André Rodrigues.

Increased search after Carnival led the book to sold out.

In the same year, an exhibit based on the novel was also shown at SESC Pinheiros.

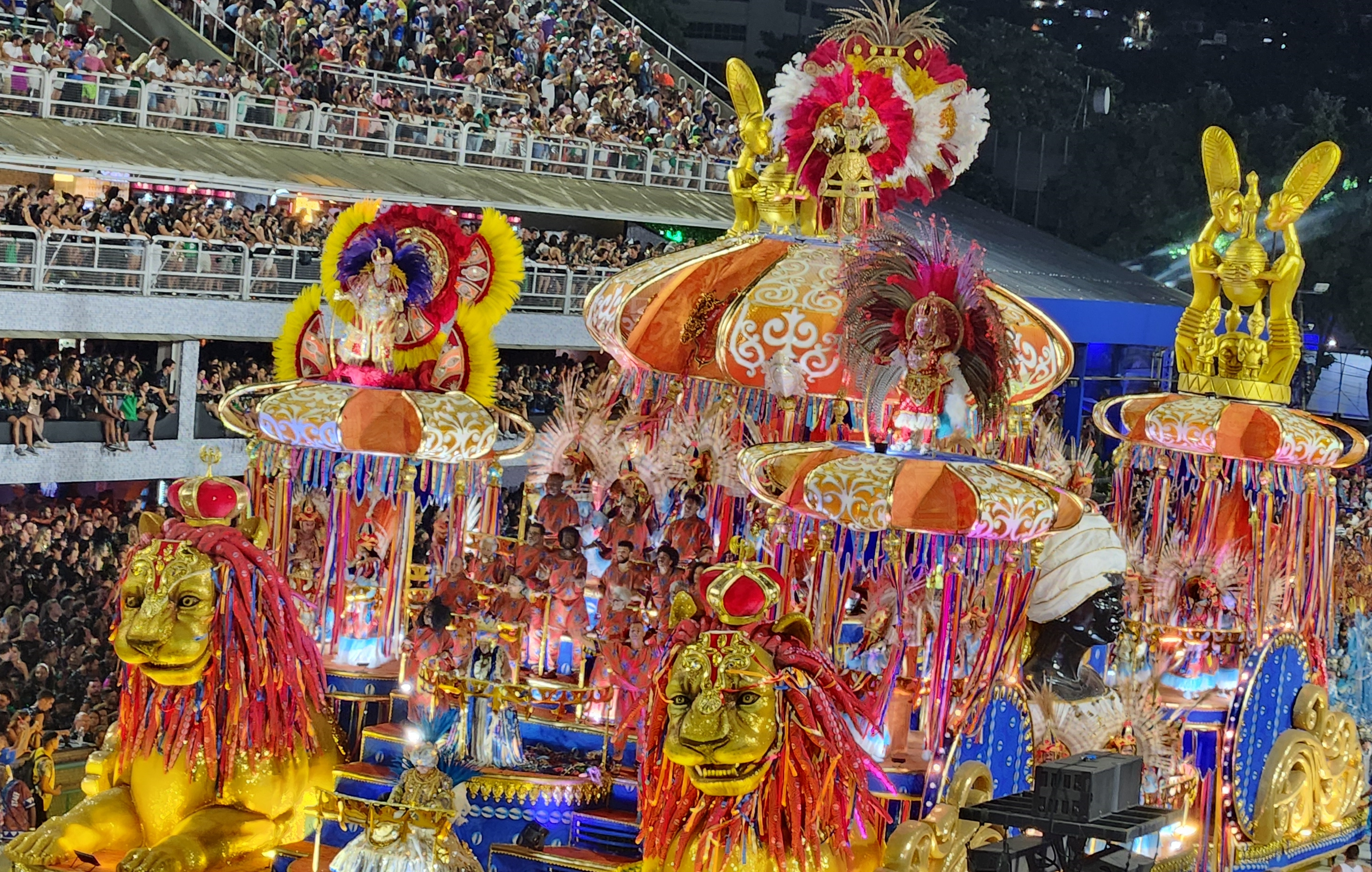
Portela parade inspired by Um Defeito de Cor

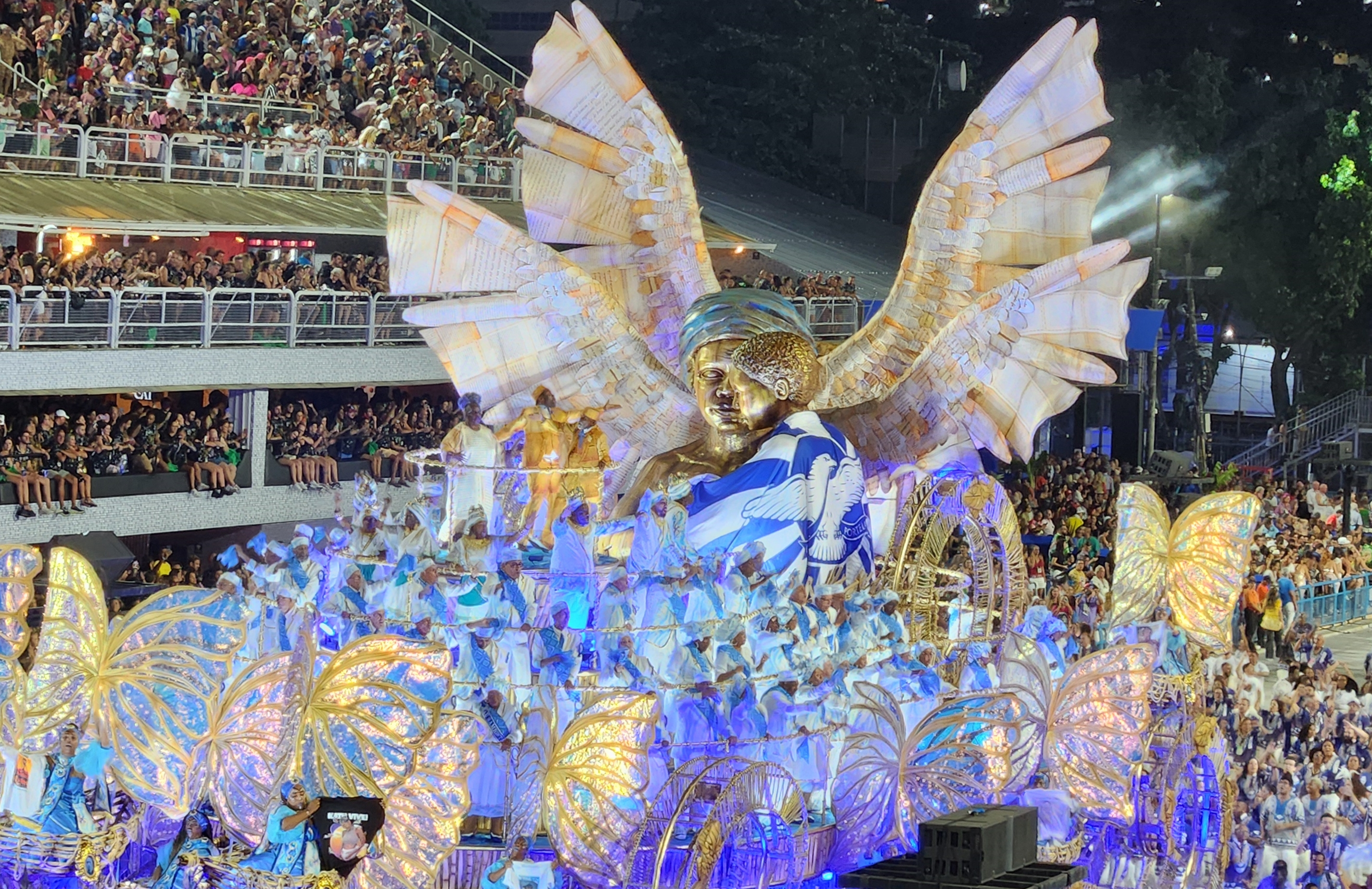

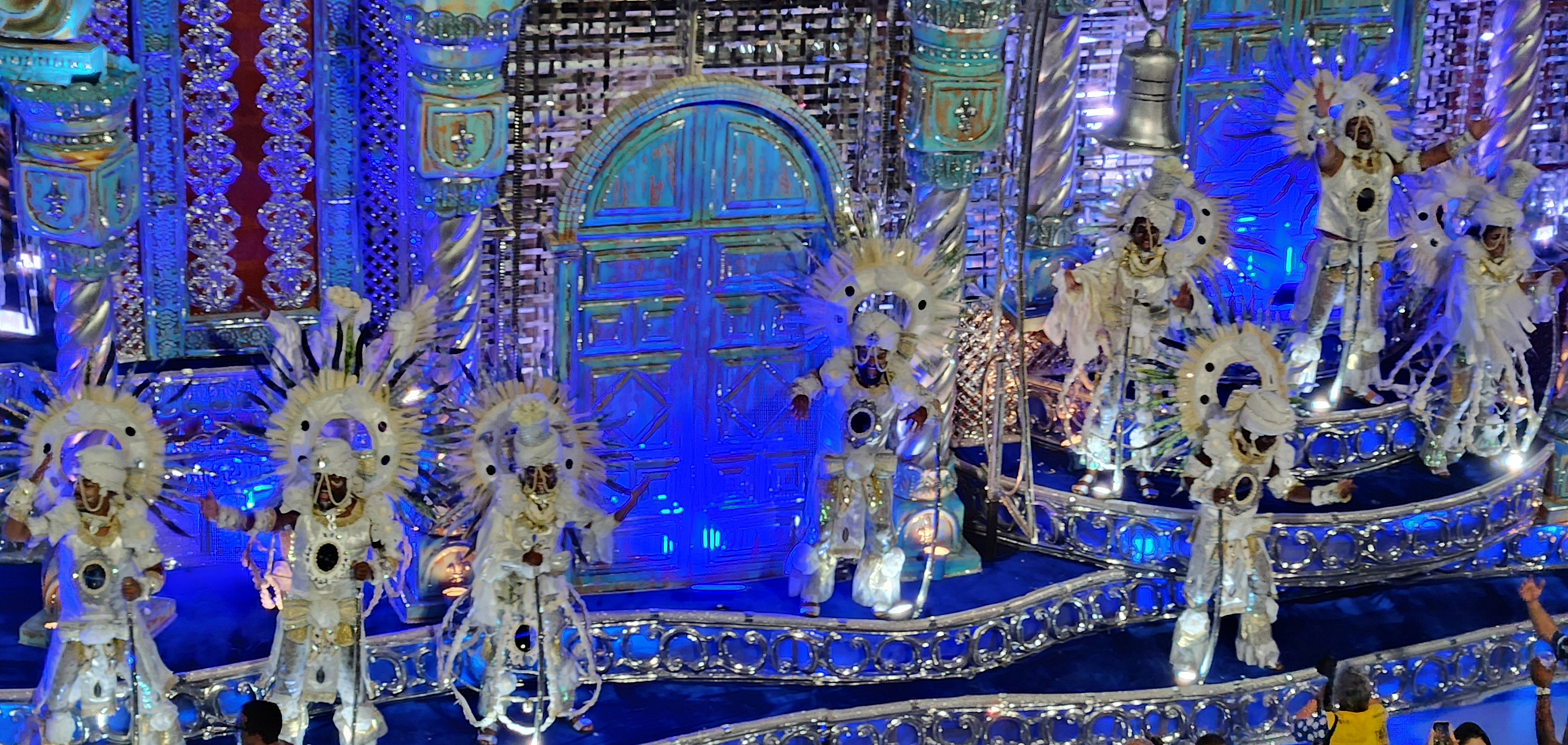

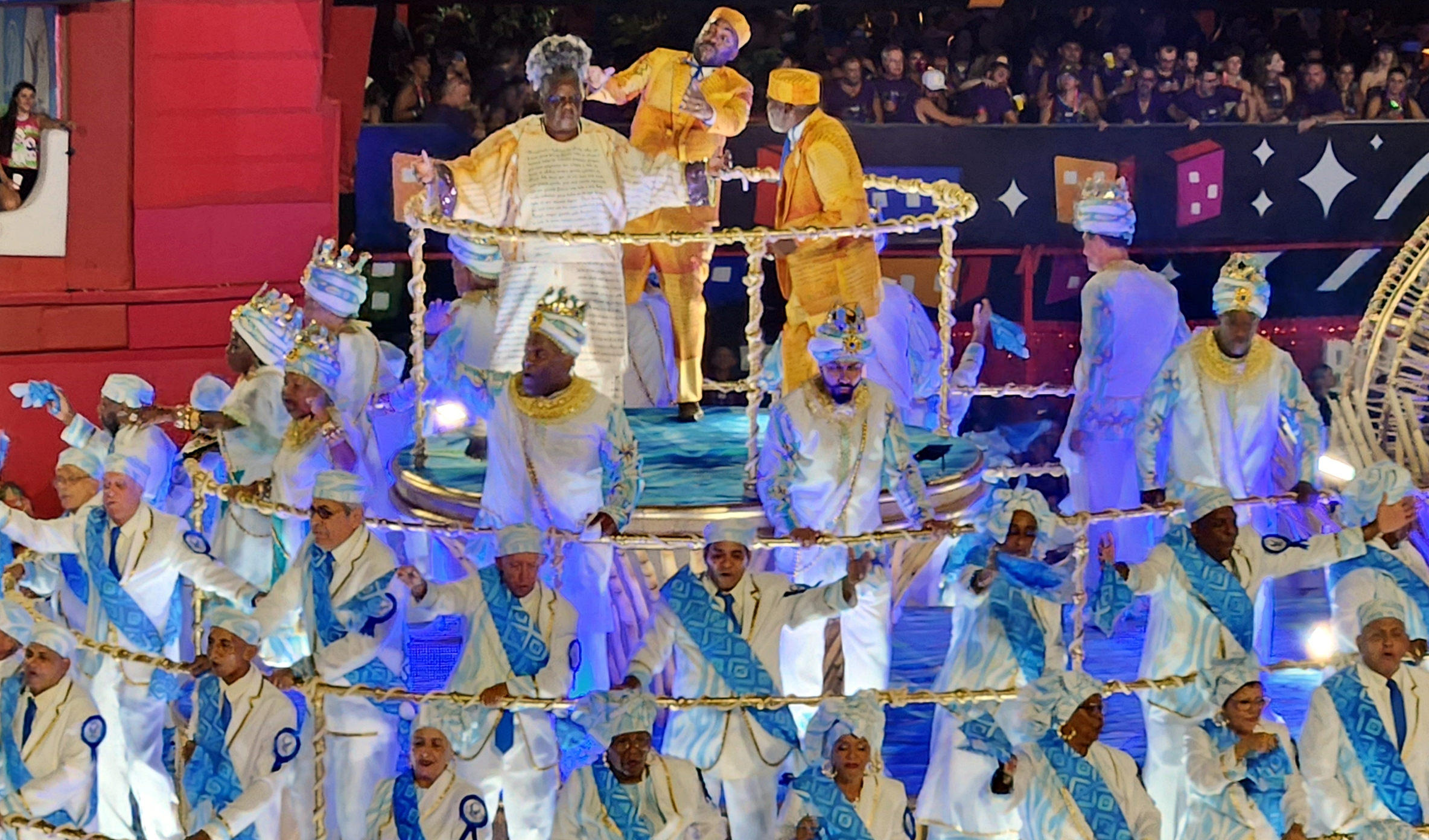

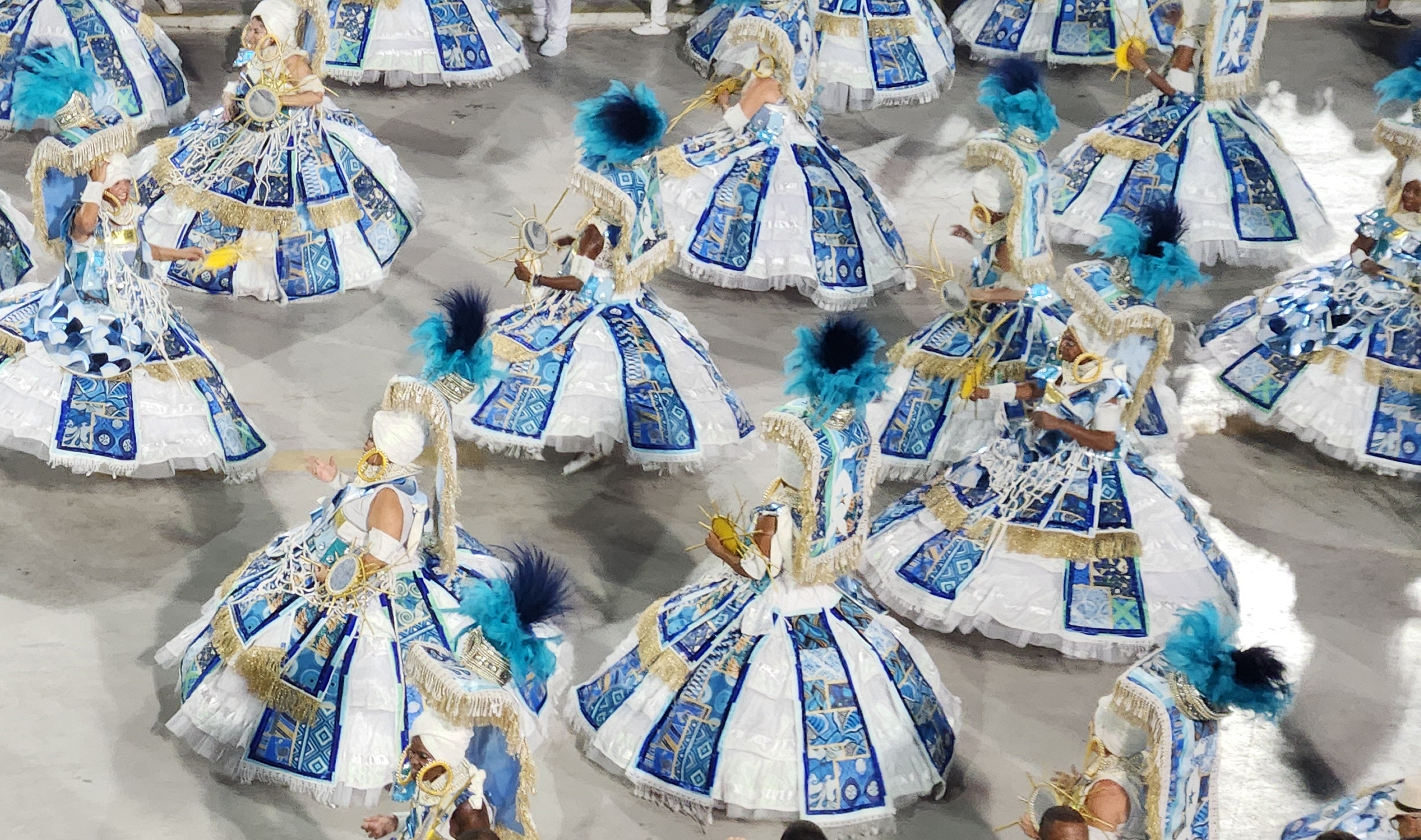

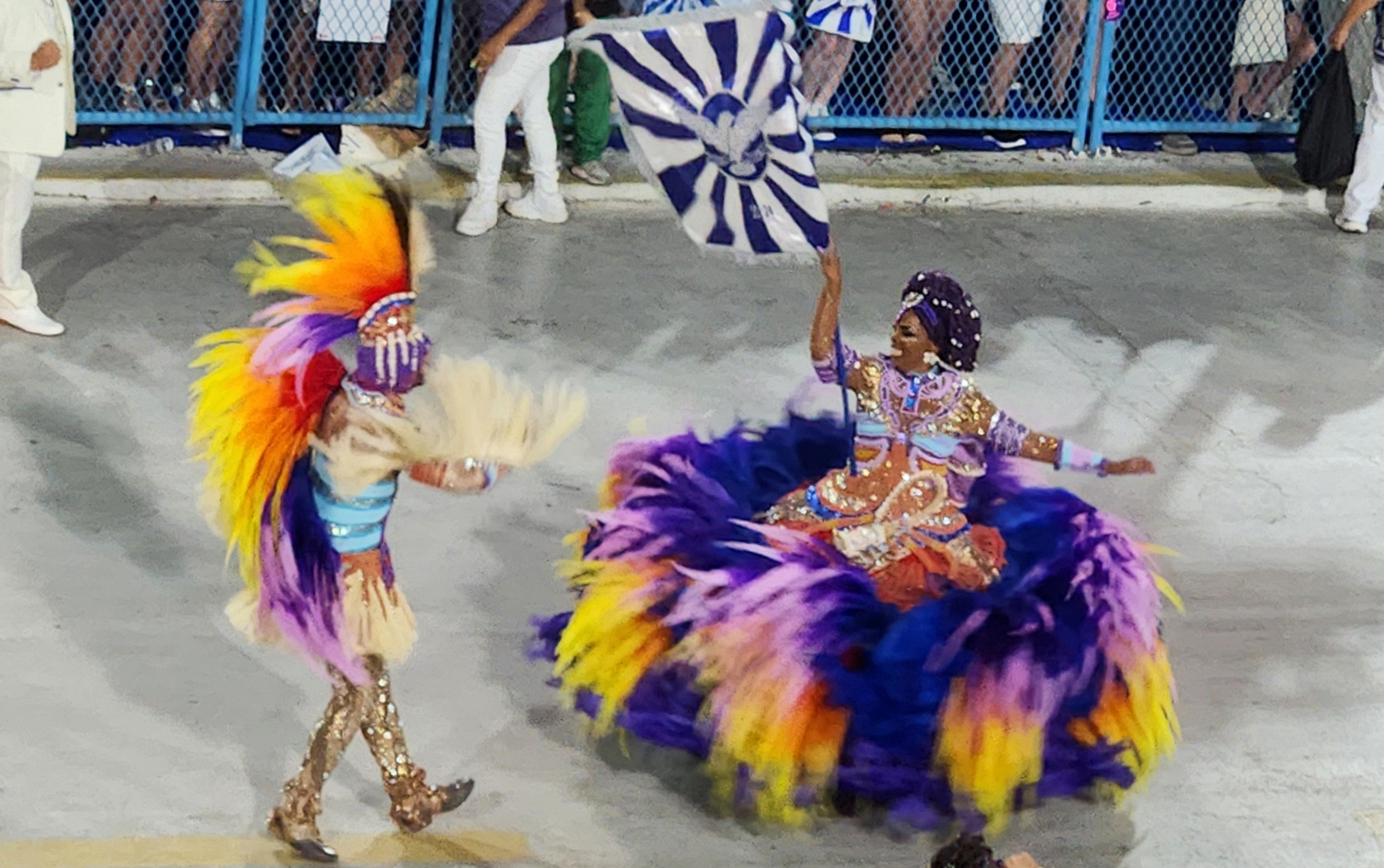
