= International Afro-descendant Women's Day =

Awareness day

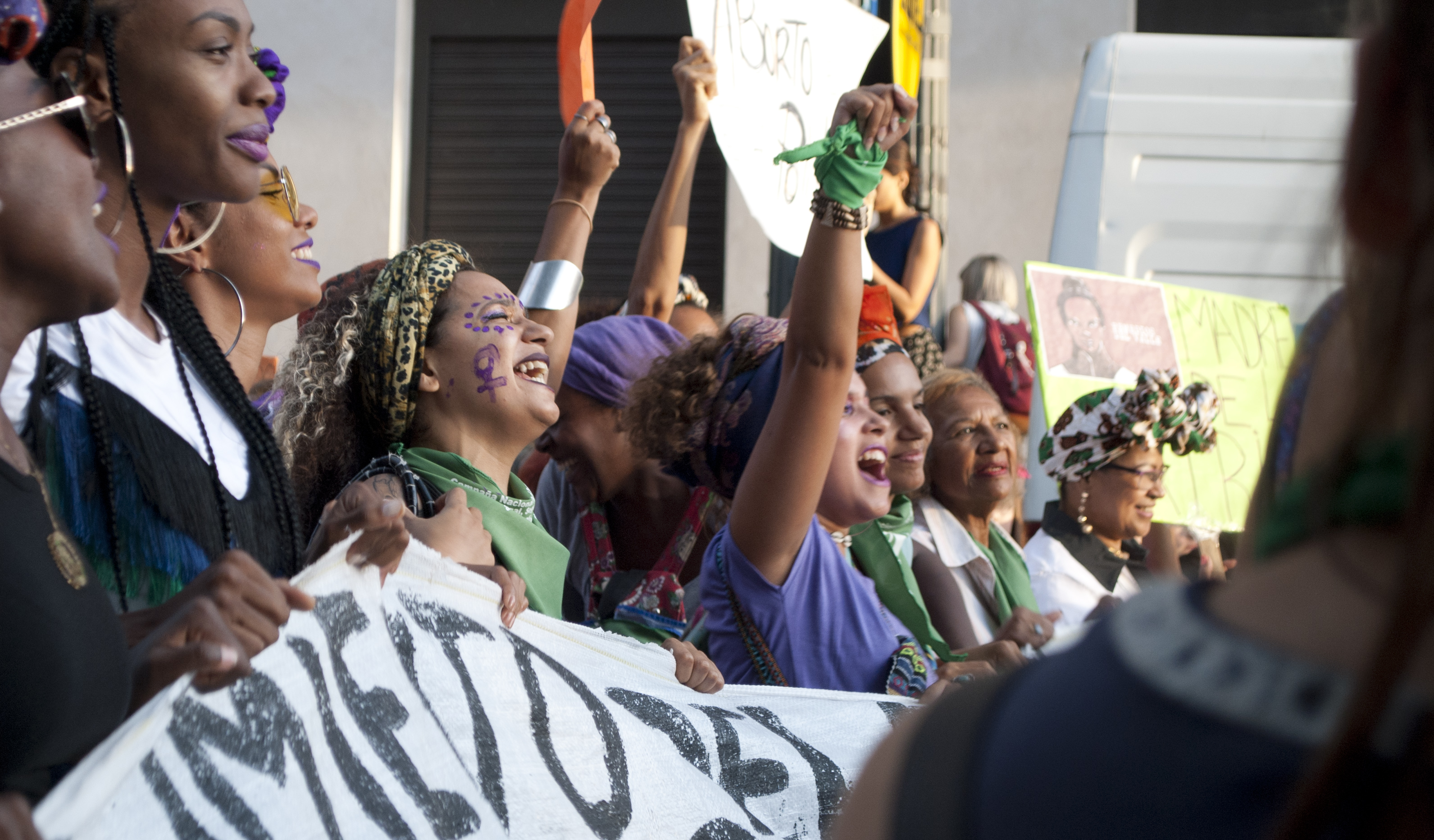
International Women's Strike 2018, Buenos Aires

The International Day of Black Latin American and Caribbean Women, shortly known as B.L.A.C Women's Day, also known as the International Afro-Latin American, Afro-Caribbean and Diaspora Women's Day and International Afro-descendant Women's Day (Spanish: Día Internacional de la Mujer Afrodescendiente), is linked to Afrofeminism movement and the broader recognition of the African diaspora and the rights of people of African descent that observed on 25 July since 1992.

== Context ==
According to Wander Women Project (WWP), in Latin America, there is a population of approximately 130 million individuals of African descent, with women comprising 51% of this group. According to Office of the United Nations High Commissioner for Human Rights and WWP, Afro-descendant people in the region often encounter racial discrimination and marginalization, which can be attributed to historical factors like slavery and colonialism. However, Afro-descendant women experience a compounded form of discrimination due to both their race and gender. Consequently, they are more susceptible to being objectified, sexualized, and subjected to various forms of physical, psychological, and sexual abuse. Furthermore, Afro-descendant women face greater obstacles in accessing quality education, employment opportunities, adequate housing, and healthcare services.

In Colombia, for example, Afro-descendant women who are human rights defenders face elevated risks of violence and threats, including femicide and rape. The violence they experience is often aimed at silencing them, controlling their territories, and intimidating their communities. These women are at risk not only for defending their territories but also for challenging stereotypical gender roles.

== History ==
This celebration has its roots in the historic gathering of Afro-descendant women that took place in the Dominican Republic on 25 July 1992. In that meeting, 300 women from 32 Latin American countries came together to discuss strategies for political advocacy and to create alliances to combat racism from a gender perspective. As a result of this significant gathering, July 25th was declared as the International Day of Afro-Descendant Women, also known as the International Day of Afro-Latin American, Afro-Caribbean, and Diaspora Women.

The United Nations declared 2015 to 2024 as the "International Decade for People of African Descent" to address the historical injustices and ongoing challenges faced by Afro-descendant communities worldwide. Within this framework, International Afro-descendant Women's Day may have emerged as a specific observance to highlight the experiences, achievements, and demands of Afro-descendant women. The Organization of American States (OAS) has recognized the day urging states to eradicate stigmatization and discrimination against Afro-descendant women and take concrete measures to prevent racial abuse and hate speech.

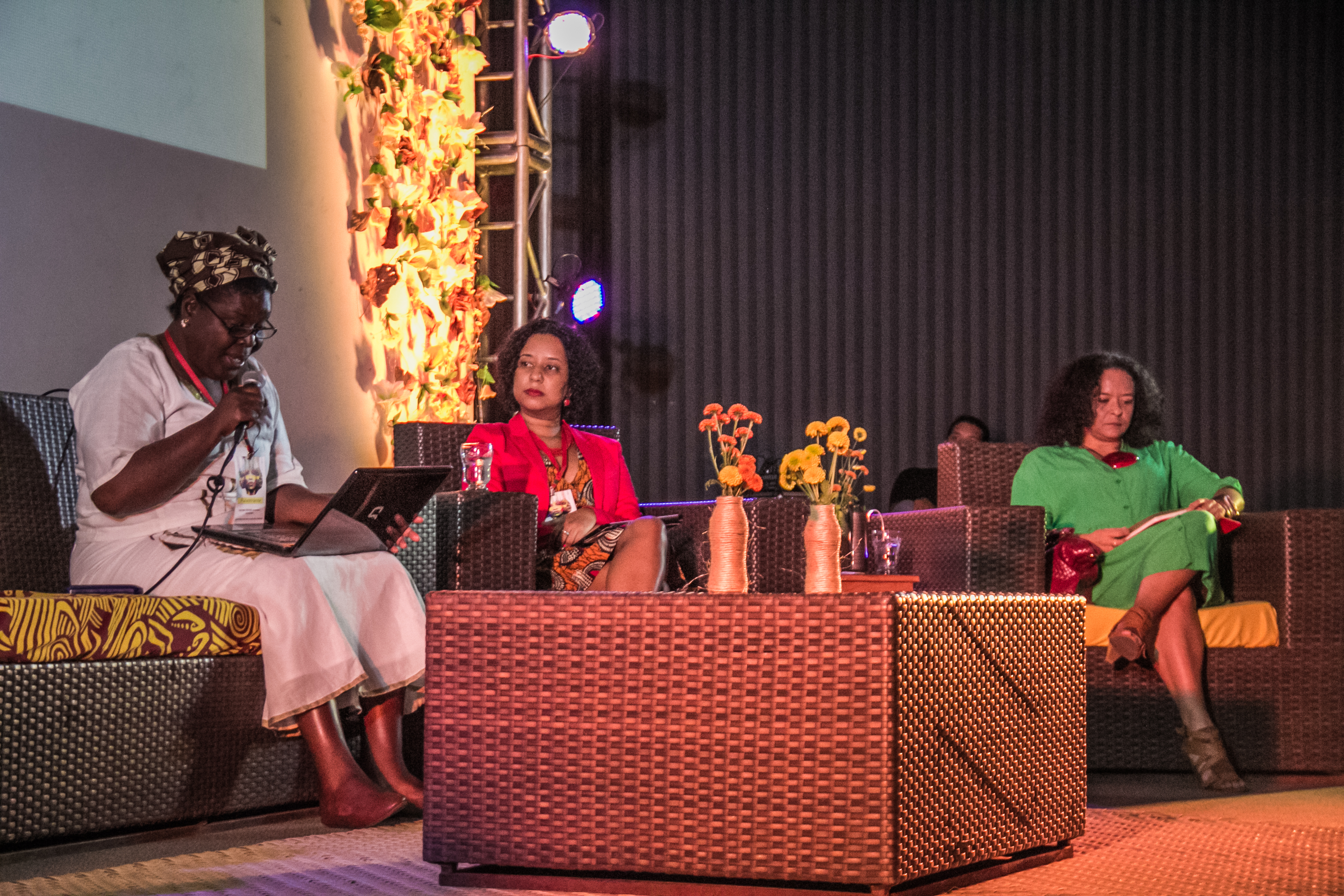
Paulina Chiziane (left), Ana Flávia Magalhães Pinto (centre), and Ana Maria Gonçalves (right) during the Festival Latinidades in 2014

The Festival Latinidades is an annual event that celebrates the day in Brasília since 2008. It is considered the largest festival of Black women in Latin America. The festival aims to promote political and cultural debates, create a space for women to share their experiences, and highlight the contributions and challenges faced by Black women in society. As of 2020, the festival has directly impacted more than 300,000 individuals, hosting over 200 training sessions and showcasing over 200 artistic performances.

== Objectives ==
Its objective is to "raise visibility for Afro-descendant women and promote public policies that help improve their quality of life and eradicate racism and discrimination". During the 1992 meeting, strategies for political advocacy and partnerships to combat racism from a gender perspective were defined.

The observance of International Afro-descendant Women's Day serves to commemorate and strengthen the fight against racial discrimination, aiming to eliminate prejudice based on ethnic and racial origins. It seeks to recognize the achievements, values, culture, and wisdom of Afro-descendant women in society. The day highlights their presence and contributions in various domains, including science, sports, law, the arts, politics, activism, and more.

The International Day of Afro-Descendant Women serves as an opportunity to commemorate and strengthen the fight against racial discrimination and prejudice based on ethnic-racial origin. It aims to recognize the achievements, values, culture, and wisdom of Afro-descendant women in society and highlight their presence and contributions in various fields such as science, sports, law, arts, politics, and activism. The celebration seeks to promote equal rights and opportunities for Afro-descendant women while challenging the systemic inequalities they face. It is an occasion to raise awareness about the experiences and challenges encountered by Afro-descendant women, fostering dialogue, advocacy, and social change.

Throughout the International Day of Afro-Descendant Women, various activities are organized, including conferences, panel discussions, workshops, artistic performances, and community events. These initiatives aim to promote dialogue, knowledge sharing, and empowerment, while addressing the specific challenges faced by Afro-descendant women. By engaging in these activities, individuals and organizations contribute to the broader goal of achieving racial and gender equality, dismantling stereotypes, and creating a more inclusive and just society.

The United Nations has also declared August 31 as the International Day for People of African Descent, which was celebrated for the first time on the 2021, aiming to highlight the contributions and eliminate all forms of discrimination against individuals of African descent globally. These commemorative days collectively contribute to raising awareness about the rights, experiences, and challenges faced by Afro-descendant individuals and communities worldwide.
