= Tancredo Neves Pantheon of the Fatherland and Freedom =

- Panteão da Pátria e da Liberdade Tancredo Neves
- Interactive map of the Tancredo Neves Pantheon of the Fatherland and Freedom area

General information
- Type: Cenotaph
- Architectural style: Modernist
- Location: Praça dos Três Poderes, Brasília, Brazil
- Coordinates: 15°48′06″S 47°51′37″W
- Construction started: 1985
- Completed: 1986

Technical details
- Floor area: 2,105 m^{2} (22,660 sq ft)

Design and construction
- Architect: Oscar Niemeyer

The Tancredo Neves Pantheon of the Fatherland and Freedom (Portuguese: Panteão da Pátria e da Liberdade Tancredo Neves) is a cenotaph in the Brazilian capital Brasília, dedicated to the honour of national heroes. It was conceived during the national shock following the death in 1985 of president-elect Tancredo Neves, the first elected civilian president after twenty years of military rule.

Unlike other national pantheons it is not a mausoleum and does not contain any tombs.

It is located in the Praça dos Três Poderes in Brasilia. It was designed by Oscar Niemeyer as a modernist building symbolizing a dove. It has three floors with a total area of 2,105 m^{2} (22,660 sq ft). The foundation stone was laid by French President François Mitterrand on 15 October 1985.

The exhibition area, entirely dedicated to Tancredo Neves, was reopened in 2013. It includes copies of documents, films by Silvio Tendler and interactive technologies.

The names of those honoured can be found in the Livro de Aço ('Book of Steel'), also called the Livro dos Heróis da Pátria ('Book of National Heroes'). This is housed on the third floor between the Painel da inconfidência, a sculpture in honour of the martyrs of eighteenth-century uprising in Minas Gerais and the stained glass by Marianne Peretti. Each time a new name and biography is entered into its metal pages a ceremony in memory of the honouree is celebrated.

== The building ==
The Pantheon of Motherland and Freedom, Tancredo Neves in the Praça dos Tres Poderes in Brasilia was designed by architect Oscar Niemeyer in 1985.

Its foundation stone was laid by French President François Mitterrand on 15 October 1985 and the Pantheon was inaugurated on 7 September 1986.

The Pantheon has three floors with a total area of 2,105 m^{2} (22,660 sq ft). Inside in the Red Hall is the Mural of Freedom by Athos Bulcão.

On the third floor is stained glass by Marianne Peretti, who also designed the glass for the Cathedral of Our Lady Aparecida in Brasilia.

On the outside, on top of a tower built on the diagonal, burns an eternal flame which represents the freedom of the people and the country's independence.

The Pantheon was listed in 2007 by the National Institute of Historic and Artistic Heritage along with 34 other works of the then 100-year-old Oscar Niemeyer.

== Honourees ==
Unlike other pantheons there are no tombs of any of the honoured. Their names and biographies are contained in the Livro de Aço ('Book of Steel'). The current names are:

- Joaquim José da Silva Xavier (Tiradentes). His was the first name entered in the book on 21 April 1992, the bicentennial of his execution.
- Zumbi dos Palmares. Entered 21 March 1997.
- Manuel Deodoro da Fonseca. Entered on 15 November 1997 on the 108th anniversary of the proclamation of the republic.
- Emperor Dom Pedro I. Proclaimed independence from Portugal and founded the Brazilian Empire. Entered on 5 September 1999 on the 177th anniversary of the proclamation of independence.
- Luís Alves de Lima e Silva, Duke of Caxias. Entered 28 January 2003.
- José Plácido de Castro. Leader of the Acrean revolution. Entered 17 November 2004 during centennial celebrations of the Treaty of Petrópolis.
- Joaquim Marques Lisboa, Marquis of Tamandaré. Entered on 13 December 2004 on the 197th anniversary of his birth and Mariner's Day.
- Francisco Manuel Barroso, Baron of Amazonas. Entered 11 June 2005 on the 140th anniversary of the naval battle of Riachuelo.
- Alberto Santos-Dumont, Entered on 26 July 2006 on the centenary of the flight of the 14-bis.
- José Bonifácio de Andrada. Patriarch of independence. Entered on 21 April 2007.
- Esperança Garcia, forcibly enslaved Afro-Brazilian woman and Brazil's first female lawyer. Entered in 2009.
- Martins, Miragaia, Dráusio e Camargo, known by the abbreviation MMDC. Heroes of the Constitutionalist Revolution of 1932 in São Paulo. Entered on 20 June 2011.
- Domingos José Martins, leader of the 1817 Pernambucan revolt
- Leonel Brizola, former governor of Rio de Janeiro and Rio Grande do Sul, and labor activist
- Zuleika Angel Jones, political activist during the 1964–85 military dictatorship, and helped raise the issue of disappeared individuals and other causes.
- Hipólito da Costa, considered to be the founding father of the Brazilian press.
- Luís Gama, lawyer, poet and journalist, and helped in the cause of the abolition of slavery.
- Saint Joseph of Anchieta, "Apostle of Brazil", co-founder of Sao Paulo and Rio de Janeiro, and founding father of Brazilian literature and theater
- Sepé Tiaraju, Guarani tribal hero from Rio Grande do Sul
- Frei Caneca, leader during the rebellion of the Confederation of the Equator
- Bárbara de Alencar, republican and advocate of women's rights
- Francisco Barreto de Meneses, João Fernandes Vieira, André Vidal de Negreiros, Henrique Dias, Antônio Filipe Camarão and Antônio Dias Cardoso, heroes of the Second Battle of Guararapes
- Jovita Feitosa, pioneer woman serviceman in the Brazilian Army who served in the Paraguayan War
- José Feliciano Fernandes Pinheiro, First Viscount of São Leopoldo, founding father of the Brazilian Historic and Geographic Institute
- Marshal Cândido Rondon, founding father of telecommunications in Brazil, explorer, advocate and friend to the indigenous Brazilians
- Brigadier Antônio de Sampaio, Brazilian hero-martyr of the Allied victory in the Battle of Tuyutí
- João Pedro Teixeira, peasant community leader of the 1950s
- Miguel Arraes, lawyer and politician, former senator, deputy and state governor of Pernambuco
- Joana Angélica, Conceptionist nun who perished during the War of Independence
- Antônio Conselheiro, Folk Catholic leader of the 1890s War of Canudos
- Dandara dos Palmares and Luísa Mahin, Afro-Brazilian slave leaders of the slave revolts during the colonial era
- Tobias Barreto, Father of 19th century Condorism
- Ulysses Guimarães, pro-democracy politician during the Martial Law years and co-writer of the 1988 Constitution
- Chico Xavier, philanthropist and spiritist medium and the father of the modern Brazilian Spiritism Doctrine
- Maria Felipa de Oliveira, woman commander who led a 200-strong force in the Brazilian victory in the Battle of Itaparica (October 1822)
- Anita Garibaldi, Brazilian wife of the Italian revolutionary Giuseppe Garibaldi
- Nise da Silveira, pioneering psychiatrist and founder of the Museum of Images of the Unconscious

The building also houses two sculptures honouring the martyrs of the Inconfidência Mineira. The first, entitled the Liberty Wall, was created by Athos Bulcão and is located on the second floor in the Red Hall. It consists of three modular walls, each measuring 13.54 metres (44.4 ft) long by 2.76 metres (9 ft 1 in) high, forming the triangular symbol of the movement. The second, entitled the Inconfidência Mineira panel was created by John Hall and Son is located on the third floor. It consists of seven panels, each illustrating a phase of the Inconfidência and culminating in the torture of Tiradentes.
