= Festival Latinidades =

Afro-descendant Women's festival

- Status: Active
- Date: 25 July (International Afro-descendant Women's Day)
- Frequency: Annual
- Location: Brasília
- Country: Brazil
- Established: 2008; 18 years ago
- Website: www.afrolatinas.com.br/o-festival/

Festival Latinidades is an annual meeting dedicated to black culture, held in Brasília since 2008. The Festival Latinidades is an annual event that celebrates the International Day of Black Latin American and Caribbean Women (also known as the International Afro-descendant Women's Day) on 25 July since 1992. It is considered the largest festival of Black women in Latin America. The festival aims to promote political and cultural debates, create a space for women to share their experiences, and highlight the contributions and challenges faced by Black women in society. As of 2020, the festival had was attended by more 300,000 individuals, hosting over 200 training sessions and showcasing over 200 artistic performances. Additionally, the festival featured participation of numerous black entrepreneurs.

The Festival Latinidades has been a significant event in empowering and amplifying the voices of Black women. It has served as a meeting point for knowledge exchange, artistic expression, and healing. Over the years, it has grown in participation and impact, attracting both national and international attendees. The festival continues to play a vital role in advocating for equity and celebrating the cultural heritage and achievements of Black women in Latin America and the Caribbean. The festival brings together music, dance, theater and literature performances, as well as debates on education, entrepreneurship, creative economy and communication. Held by the Afrolatinas Institute, and most of the programming is host in the Museu Nacional Honestino Guimarães.

The 12th edition of Latinidades held at the São Paulo Cultural Center, marking the first time the event is being hosted outside Brasília. Through a dynamic program consisting of performances, exhibitions, and discussions, the festival aims to bolster the identity, political and technical development, entrepreneurship, as well as foster artistic, cultural, and intellectual contributions of black women.

The 16th edition of the Festival Latinidades took place in 2023 with the theme of "Bem Viver" (Good Living). The festival featured a diverse program including workshops, panels, conferences, shows, lectures, and debates with national and international experts. The event was held in several cities, starting in Brasília, followed by Rio de Janeiro, São Paulo, and Salvador. In Brasília, the festival took place at the Museu Nacional from 6–9 July. The theme of "Bem Viver" explores the Andean social system of good living, which advocates for an alternative way of living that prioritises care for others and the environment over profit and development. The concept challenges the current logic of capitalism and emphasises access to public policies, reparations, care, and self-care. The festival provided a platform for discussions on how good living can be integrated into various aspects of people's lives.

== Themes ==
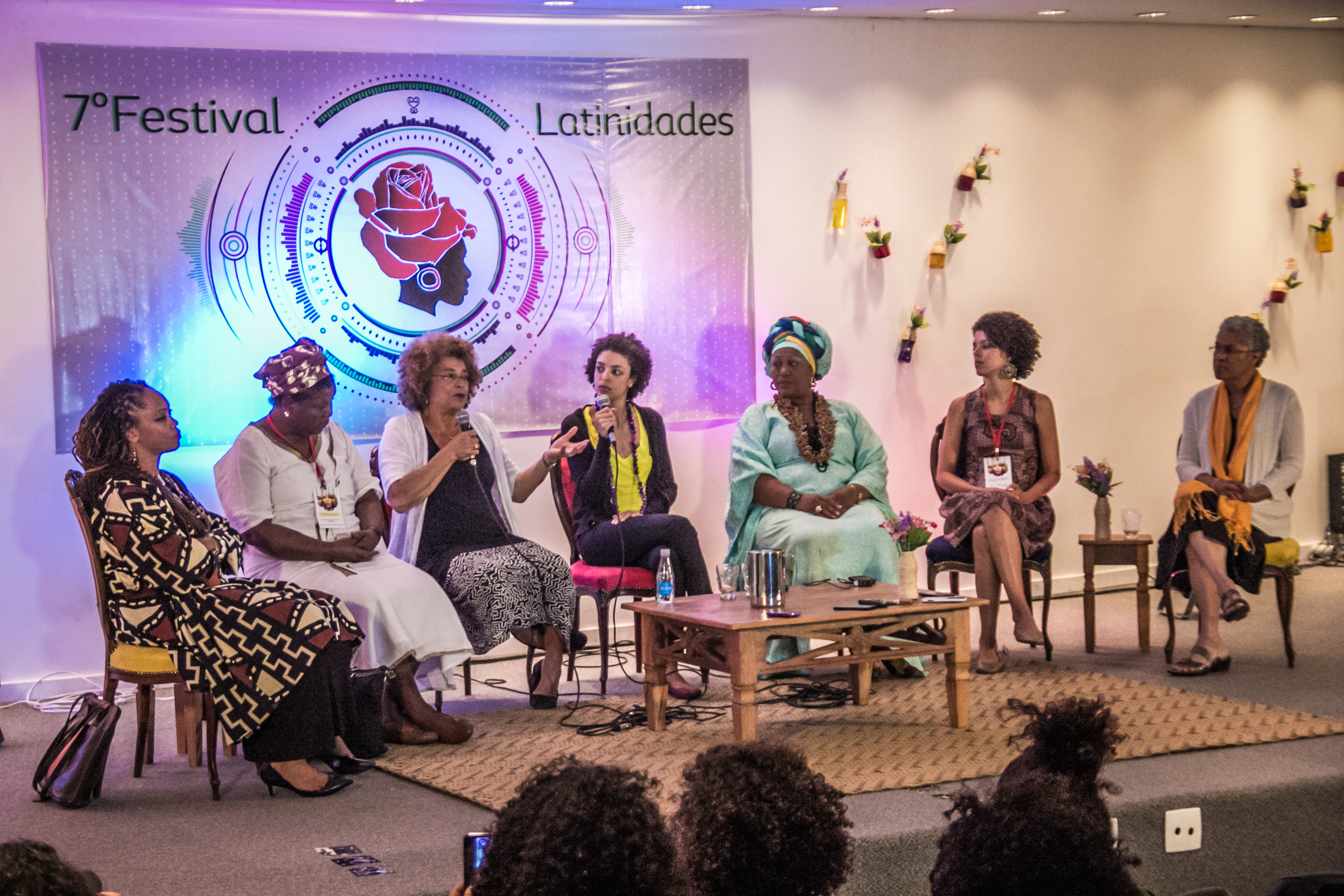
Press Conference, during the Festival Latinidades in 2014, with guests (from left to right) Shirley Campbell Barr (Costa Rica), Paulina Chiziane (Mozambique), Angela Davis (USA), Unknown, Ana Maria Gonçalves (Brazll), Marlene Tello (Colombia), and Patricia Hill Collins (USA)

- 2008 - Afro-Latin American and Caribbean Women's Day
- 2009 - Black women in the media
- 2010 - Census and Public Policies for Black Women
- 2011 - Black Women in the Labor Market
- 2012 - Black Youth
- 2013 - Black Art and Culture – Afro-descendant Memory and Public Policies
- 2014 - Black Diaspora Griots
- 2015 - Black Cinema
- 2016 - Communication
- 2017 - Horizons of freedom: Afrofuturism on the wings of Sanfoka
- 2019 - Repossession
- 2020 - Black Utopias
- 2021 - Dark Ascension
- 2022 - Black women
- 2023 - "Bem Viver" (Good Living)
- 2024 - Vem Ser Fã de Mulheres Negras (Come Be a Fan of Black Women)
