= Netto Question =

Collective case that freed 217 slaves in Imperial Brazil

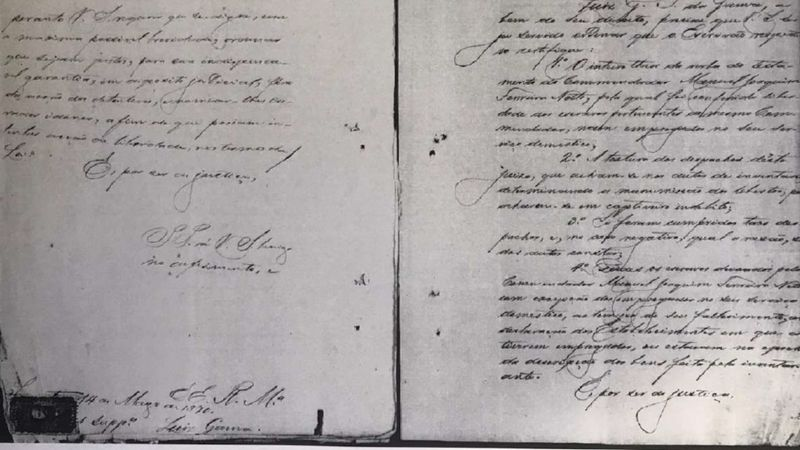
- Image of the process where you can read Luís Gama's name in the lower left corner.
- Native name: Questão Netto
- English name: Netto Question
- Date: 1870–1872
- Location: Empire of Brazil
- Cause: Crime for enslaving captives already declared free
- Motive: Heirs unwilling to abide their father's will
- Target: 217 enslaved people
- Participants: Manoel Joaquim Ferreira Netto's family members and partners Luís Gama; José Bonifácio the Younger; Saldanha Marinho
- Outcome: Total freedom from the slaves after 1878

The Netto Question (Portuguese: Questão Netto) was the largest collective action for the liberation of slaves in the Americas. The lawsuit is related to the liberation of 217 slaves in Brazilian lands in the 1870s.

== Background ==
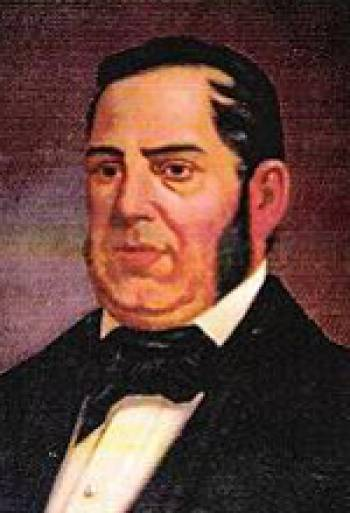
Manoel Joaquim Ferreira Netto

Manoel Joaquim Ferreira Netto, a Portuguese-born nobleman with many possessions in Brazil, stated in his will that after his death, all his slaves should be freed, what at the time was called "post-mortem manumission". His death occurred on April 5, 1868, but his request, made in his will, was not fulfilled.

The black lawyer and abolitionist Luís Gama read a newspaper article in June 1869 that reported the legal dispute of Ferreira Netto's relatives over the patriarch's estate, and became interested in the slaves' situation. Gama discovered that all the captives were still in the same situation as prior to Ferreira Netto's death.

== The judicial action ==
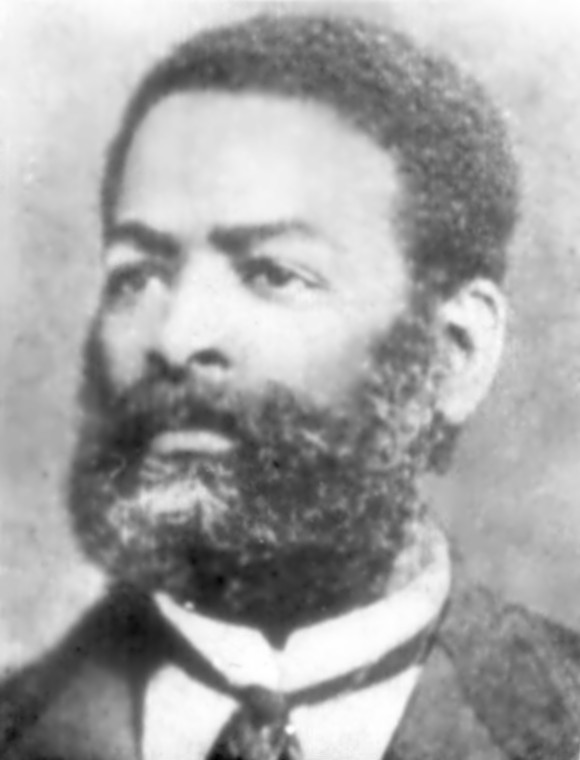
Luís Gama, the free black abolitionist lawyer who worked in this case

After a petition by Luís Gama in the Santos court about the situation of the captives and the confirmation by third parties that the slaves were still in the service of the heirs and former partners, the lawyer brought an action in the Brazilian courts to have the right expressed in Ferreira Netto's will fully enforced, and conducted a background survey on each of the 217 slaves.

In defense, Ferreira Netto's heirs hired the jurist, abolitionist and poet José Bonifácio the Younger, to represent their rights in the lawsuit filed by Luís Gama.

In the middle of the lawsuit, Gama was appointed, by the judge, as curator of the "liberandos" (liberandos, "those being freed", was how Luís Gama referred to the slaves; he never used the word "slave").

Under the allegation that the heirs were committing a crime by enslaving people already declared free, Gama obtained success with the Santos forum, when the judge determined the liberation of all the slaves.

Through a delaying tactic by José Bonifácio, the case went to another legal instance and thus the release of the victims was postponed. In these instances, the case was ruled in favor of Gama.

In 1872, the action reached the Supreme Court of Justice (STJ), in Rio de Janeiro. At this court, the action was represented by the lawyer, journalist and politician Saldanha Marinho, since the STJ did not accept the work of Gama outside of the São Paulo jurisdiction. However, the final argument was prepared by Luís Gama.

=== Conclusions ===
The ministers of the STJ accepted the thesis of Luís Gama and Saldanha Marinho, with reservations, when the full freedom of the captives could only happen 12 years after the drafting of the will. The will was drawn up in 1866. In other words, the captives had to provide forced services for Ferreira Netto's heirs until 1878, when they would finally be free.

== Freedom ==
Luís Gama considered the "conditional freedom" as a defeat, but abolitionists celebrated it as a victory, because never in the history of Brazil had there been a collective freedom of this size. In addition, there were no records in the history of the continent of a similar action with a higher number than the "Netto Question". The final result was little reported in the country, because most of the Brazilian press was linked to the slaveholding landowners, so they feared that the repercussion could generate new lawsuits.

Total freedom only occurred in 1878, at the end of the deadline set by the STJ; however, of the 217 slaves, only 130 remained alive to enjoy the freedom won, exactly a decade before the abolition of slavery in Brazil. Due to José Bonifácio's actions in favor of the slave-owning family, the friendship between him and Luís Gama was broken.

== Historical research ==
The documentation referring to the Netto Question was recovered in the 21st century by historian Bruno Rodrigues de Lima, who earned his doctorate in History and Theory of Law from the Max Planck Institute. The process document, with more than a thousand handwritten pages, is stored in the Brazilian National Archives and was copied by Bruno to be studied in Germany, where he had to decipher the various handwritings.

== See also ==
- Slavery in Brazil
