= Luís Gama =

19th-century Brazilian lawyer and abolitionist

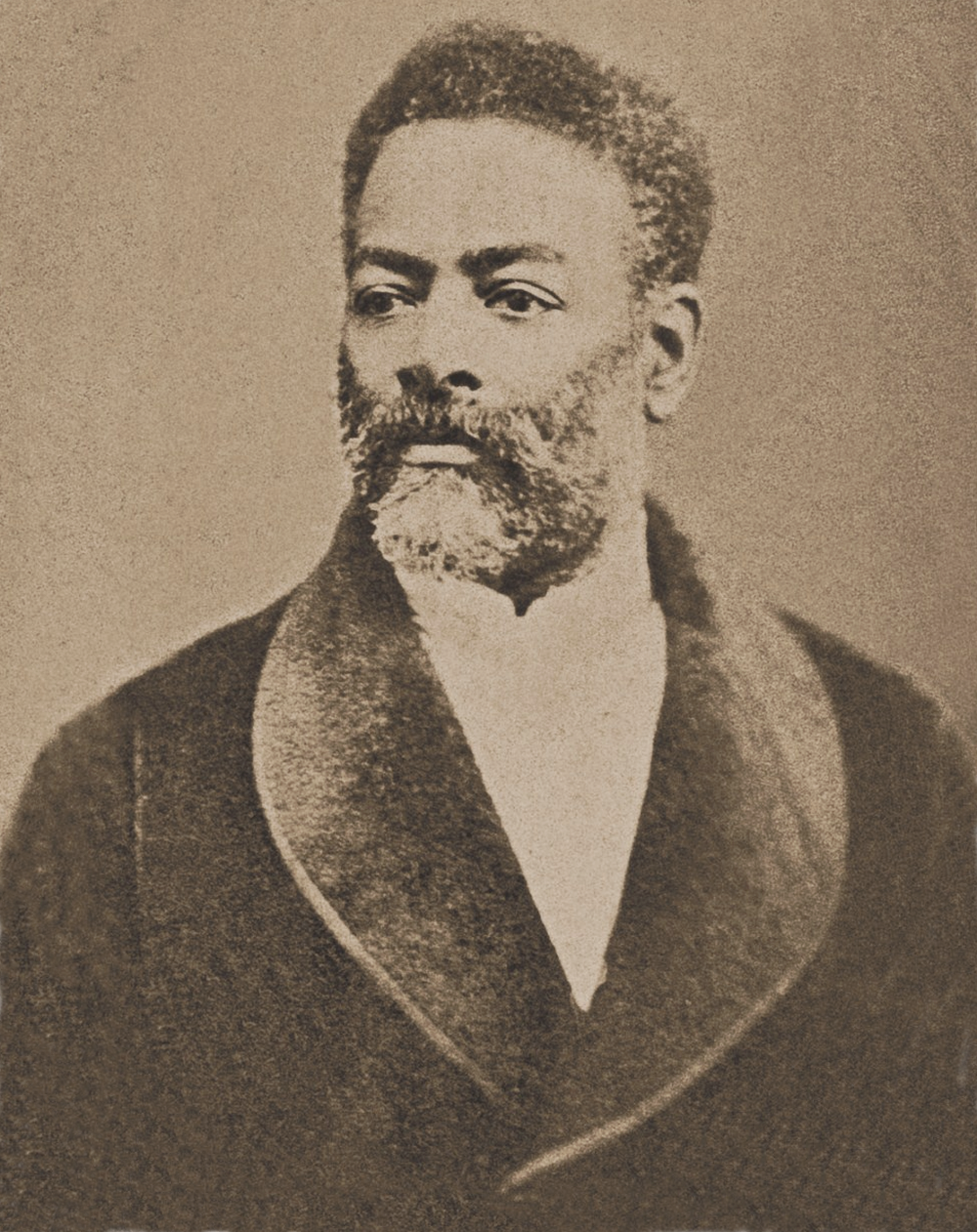
- Gama, c. 1880
- Born: 21 June 1831; Salvador, Bahia, Brazil
- Died: 24 August 1882 (aged 51); São Paulo, São Paulo, Brazil
- Monuments: Luiz Gama
- Other names: Afro, Getúlio, Barrabaz, Spartacus and John Brown
- Education: Autodidact
- Occupations: Lawyer, writer, abolitionist
- Known for: Being able to free more than 500 people from slavery.
- Notable work: Primeiras Trovas Burlescas de Getulino
- Political party: Liberal; PRP (1873)
- Spouse: Claudina Fortunata Sampaio
- Children: Benedito Graco Pinto da Gama
- Parents: A fidalgo from a Portuguese family (father); Luísa Mahin (mother)
- Awards: XXXII Prêmio Franz de Castro Holzwarth de Direitos Humanos (posthumous)

Luís Gonzaga Pinto da Gama (Note: In the 19th-century spelling, his name was written as "Luiz Gonzaga Pinto da Gama".) (21 June 1831 – 24 August 1882) was a Brazilian lawyer, abolitionist, orator, journalist and writer, and the Patron of the abolition of slavery in Brazil.

Born to a free black mother and a white father, he was nevertheless made a slave at the age of 10, and remained illiterate until the age of 17. He judicially won his own freedom and began to work as a lawyer on behalf of the captives, and by the age of 29 he was already an established author and considered "the greatest abolitionist in Brazil".

Although considered one of the exponents of romanticism, works such as Manuel Bandeira's "Apresentação da Poesia Brasileira" do not even mention his name. He had such a unique life that it is difficult to find, among his biographers, any who do not become passionate when portraying him – being himself also charged with passion, emotional and yet captivating.

He was a black intellectual in 19th century slave-owning Brazil, the only self-taught and the only one to have gone through the experience of captivity. He spent his life fighting for the abolition of slavery and for the end of the monarchy in Brazil, but died six years before these causes were accomplished. In 2018 his name was inscribed in the Steel Book of national heroes deposited in the Tancredo Neves Pantheon of the Fatherland and Freedom.

== Panorama from the time ==
São Paulo, where Gama lived for forty-two years, was in the middle of the 19th century a still small provincial capital that, with the demand for coffee production from the 1870s on, saw the price of slaves reach a level that made their urban possession almost prohibitive. Until this period, however, it was quite common the property of "rent slaves", on whose work their owners drew their source of sustenance, alongside the so-called "domestic slaves". (Note: A good example of this were the seven spinster sisters of Marshal José Arouche de Toledo Rendon – Caetana, Gertrudes, Joaquina, Pulquéria, Leocádia, Ana Teresa and Reduzinda – who lived off the income obtained from the labor of 39 slaves.)

It had a population ten times smaller than that of the Court (Rio de Janeiro), and a very strong presence of legal culture because, since 1828, one of the only two law schools in the country had been established there, the Largo de São Francisco Law School, (Note: Mouzar Benedito work says that his attempt to study in university occurred in 1850, the year he got married.) which received students from all over the country, coming from all social strata – besides the children of the rural oligarchy, members of the intellectual elite that was being formed at the time (Gama defined it, then, as "Noah's Ark in a small way").

== Childhood and slavery ==
Luís Gama was born on 21 June 1831, at Bângala street Nº2, in the centre from the city of Salvador, Bahia. Even with little information about his childhood, it is known that he was the son of Luísa Mahin, a freed African ex-slave, and the son of a Portuguese fidalgo who lived in Bahia. At the age of seven, his mother traveled to Rio de Janeiro to participate in the Sabinada revolt, never to meet him again. In 1840, his father ended up in debt with gambling, so he resorted to selling Luís Gama as a slave to pay his debts. There is no evidence that his father sought him out after that. As an adult, Gama understood that when he was sold he was a victim of the crime of "Enslaving a free person, who is in possession of his freedom.", provided in Article 179 from Criminal Code of the Empire of Brazil, sanctioned shortly after his birth. Furthermore, due to the fact that the revolts that took place in Bahia led to the prohibition of the sale of slaves from this province to other regions of Brazil, the sale and transport of Luís Gama to São Paulo was constituted as contraband.

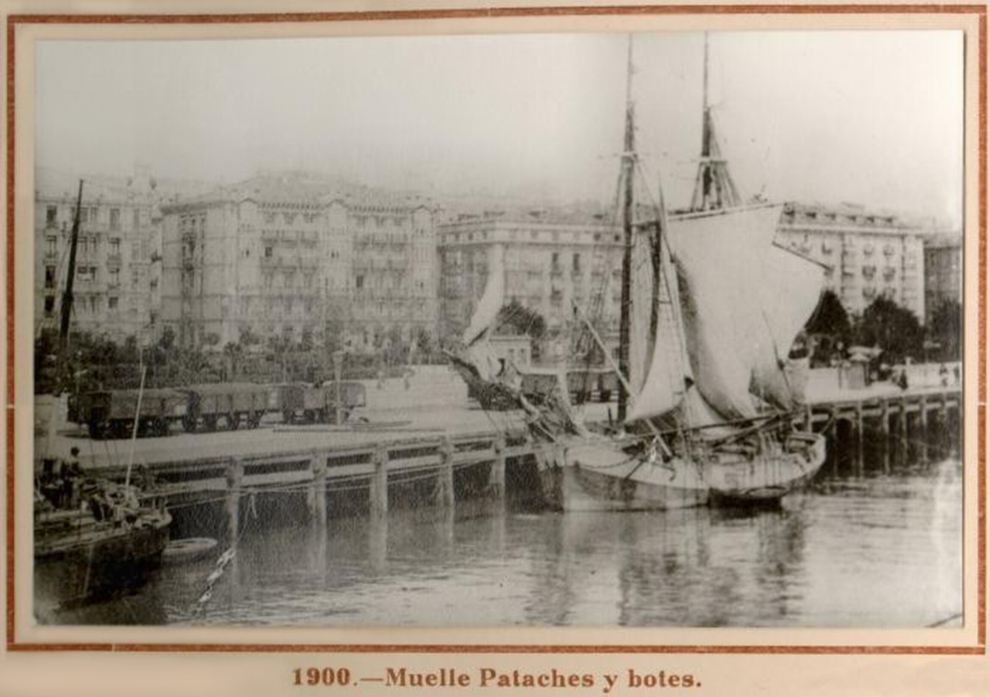
A patache, a type of sailing vessel in which Luís Gama traveled as a slave.

In an autobiographical letter he sent in 1880 to Lúcio de Mendonça, he describes his birth and early childhood thus:

I was born in the city of S. Salvador, capital of the Bahia province, in a two-story house at Bângala Street, forming an internal angle, in the "Quebrada", on the right side from the Palma churchyard, in the Sant'Ana parish, on June 21, 1830, at 7 in the morning, and I was baptized, eight years later, in the main church of Sacramento, in the city of Itaparica.

Lígia Ferreira, one of the researchers who has most studied Gama's life, points out that this information could not be verified, although she stresses that the sobrado where he was born still exists; the register of his baptism could not be found, and adds to this the fact that the omission of his father's name from his account casts doubt on his real identity. (Note: There is, in the historical memory of Salvador, an enormous gap derived from the bombing of the city in 1912 that, among other destruction's, burned the centuries-old documentation of what had been the first capital of Brazil.)

Researchers Lisa Earl Castillo and Wlamyra Albuquerque announced the discovery of new documents in the Bahia State Public Archives that they claim contain previously unpublished information about Luiz Gama’s life, which could lead to new theories regarding his birth, childhood, and parentage.

Among the documents found was the alleged baptismal record, registered at the Parish of the Blessed Sacrament and St. Anne in the city of Salvador in October 1831, which is said to have been the first baptism—in contrast to the second baptism, which is said to have taken place years later but has never been found:

Luis Parvulo

On the second of October, eighteen hundred and thirty-one, in this parish church of the Holy Sacrament and St. Anne, I solemnly baptized and anointed with the holy oils LUIS, a mixed-race child, three and a half months old, son of Luiza, a slave of Maria Rosa de Jesus, unmarried, residing in this parish; his godfather was Antonio Agostinho, unmarried, residing in the same parish. And for the record, I have drawn up this entry, which I have signed. The Vicar, Manoel Coelho de S. Payo Menezes.

Put up for sale, he was rejected "for being Bahian". After the Malê revolt, a stigma was created that Bahian captives were rebellious and more likely to run away. He was taken to Rio de Janeiro where he was sold to Antonio Pereira Cardoso, a slave trader who took him to be resold in São Paulo. From the Port of Santos, Gama and the other slaves were taken on foot to be sold in Jundiaí and Campinas. With all the buyers resisting buying him because he was from Bahia, Gama began working as a domestic slave on the ensign's property, washing and ironing clothes, and then became a slave for hire, working as a seamstress and shoemaker in the town of Lorena.

== Freedom and adulthood ==
In 1847, Luís Gama had contact with a law student, Antônio Rodrigues do Prado Júnior, who stayed at his master's house and taught him the alphabet. The following year Gama was already literate and had taught the ensign's children to read, which he used as an argument in favor of his alforria, which was not successful. With this, Luís Gama was able to prove his freedom and joined the army in 1848. It remains unclear, however, the artifices used by Luis Gama to obtain his freedom, (Note: Author Mouzar Benedito says that this is due to the fact that Rui Barbosa had decreed the destruction of all documentation relating to slavery.) and it is suggested that he may have used the testimony of his father – whose identity he was careful to keep obscure. There is also the theory that Gama would have run away from the estate and argued that he was free because he could read and write, which were skills that most slaves did not possess. He was part of the City Guard from 1848 until 1854, when he was imprisoned for 39 days due to "insoburdination" after "threatening an insolent officer" who had insulted him. Before that, in 1850, he had married Claudina Fortunata Sampaio.

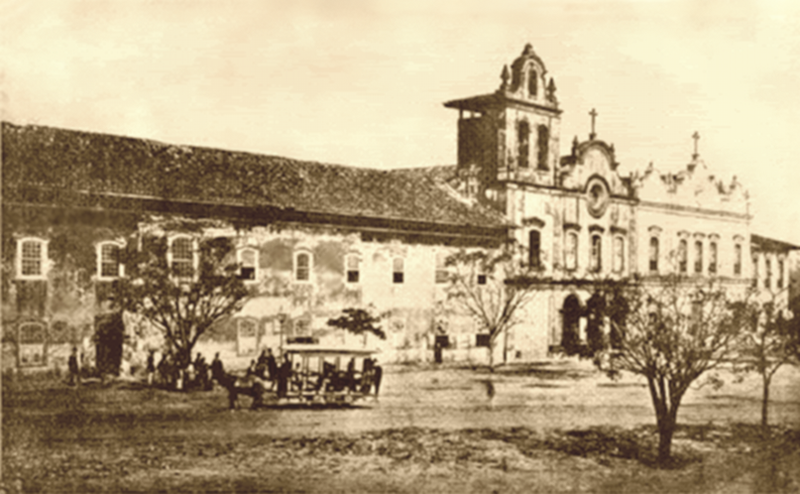
Photograph of the Largo de São Francisco Law School in 1860.

Even while serving in the army, he was chosen to work as a copyist for official authorities in his spare time, since he had good calligraphy. In 1856, he was hired as a clerk at the São Paulo Police Department, in the office of Francisco Maria de Souza Furtado de Mendonça, a counselor and law professor. With the knowledge of Francisco Mendonça and having his library at his disposal, Luís Gama further studied the subject of law until he made the decision to graduate from the Largo de São Francisco Law School. However, the students of the Faculty were against it, making it impossible for Luís Gama to enroll, so he began to study on his own, as attending classes as a listener and became a "rábula", the name given to the individual who had enough legal knowledge to be a lawyer, even without a law degree. After acting in slave cases, Gama was dismissed from his position at the Secretariat of Police, in 1868, due to pressure from conservatives who were dissatisfied with the freedoms won by the rábula. Gama defined his dismissal "for the good of the public service" as a consequence of the work he had been doing to free slaves who were in an illegal situation, in addition to denouncing the system's abuses, or, in his words

the turmoil consisted in my being part of the Liberal Party; and, through the press and the ballot box, fighting for the victory of my and his [Lúcio de Mendonça, to whom he writes] ideas; and promoting lawsuits of free people criminally enslaved, and lawfully assisting, to the extent of my efforts, slave freedoms, because I detest captivity and all masters, especially kings.

== Literature ==
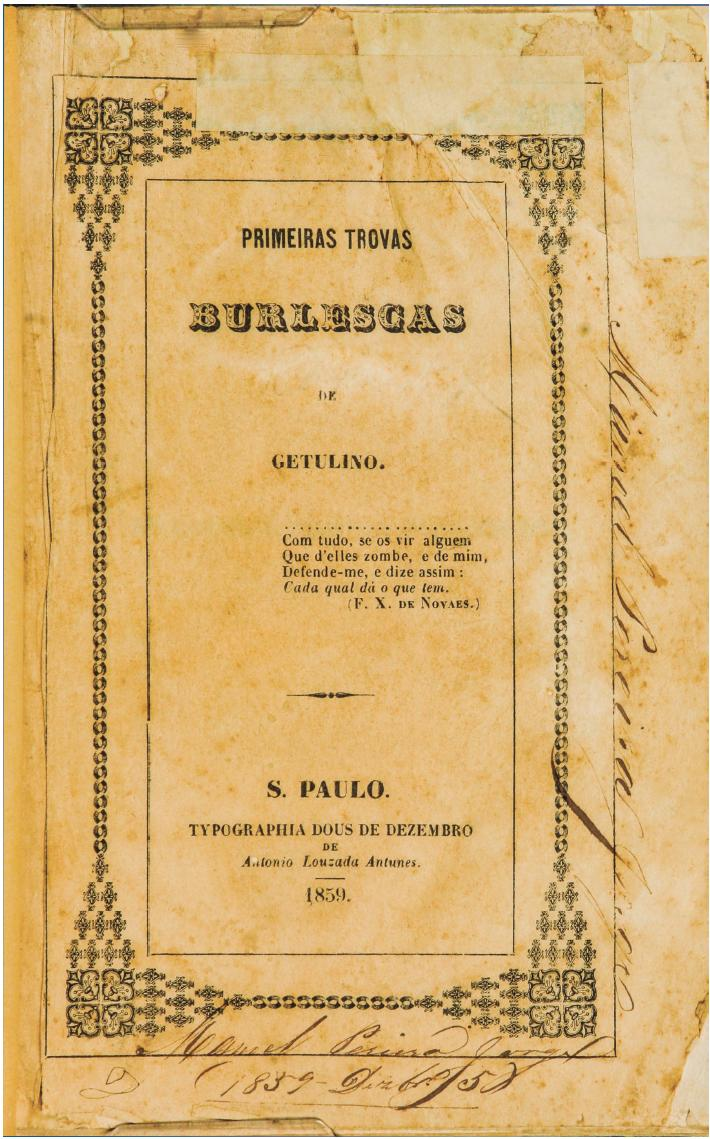
Cover of the first edition of Primeiras Trovas Burlescas, published in 1859.

Gama was a reader of the Vida de Jesus (Life of Jesus), by the French philosopher Ernest Renan, originally published in 1863 and soon translated in Brazil, being one of the first to refer to it in the country. His only work, originally published in two editions (1859 and 1861), Primeiras Trovas Burlescas, placed him in the literary pantheon of Brazil only twelve years after he learned to read. This book, dedicated to Salvador Furtado de Mendonça, a magistrate who taught at the Largo de S. Francisco and who also managed his library there (which allows us to infer that he facilitated Gama's access to his collection), also has poems by his friend José Bonifácio the Younger, attached. The third edition of the work only came out posthumously, in 1904.

=== Poetry: the "Orpheus with a curly top" ===
Recalling the figure of the Greek poet Orpheus, and alluding to his curly hair, Gama was called "Orpheus with a curly top", and mastered both lyric and satirical poetry.

His poetics is written in the first person, without hiding his own origin and without failing to proclaim his blackness; at the same time, he does not fail to use the traditional images of his time, such as mythological evocations (like Orpheus, Cupid, etc.) or the poets of the past (like Lamartine, Camões, for example).

However, Gama reverts these images to his condition: the muse is from Guinea, Orpheus has "curly top". In portraying white society, he uses strongly satirical images:

Com sabença profunda irei cantando
Altos feitos da gente luminosa,
(...)
Espertos manganões de mão ligeira,
Emproados juízes de trapaça,
E outros que de honrados têm fumaça,
Mas que são refinados agiotas.

Translation:

With deep wisdom I will sing
High deeds of the luminous people,
(...)
Clever manganese with a light hand,
And others who are honored with smoke,
And others who are honorable as smoke,
But who are refined loan sharks.

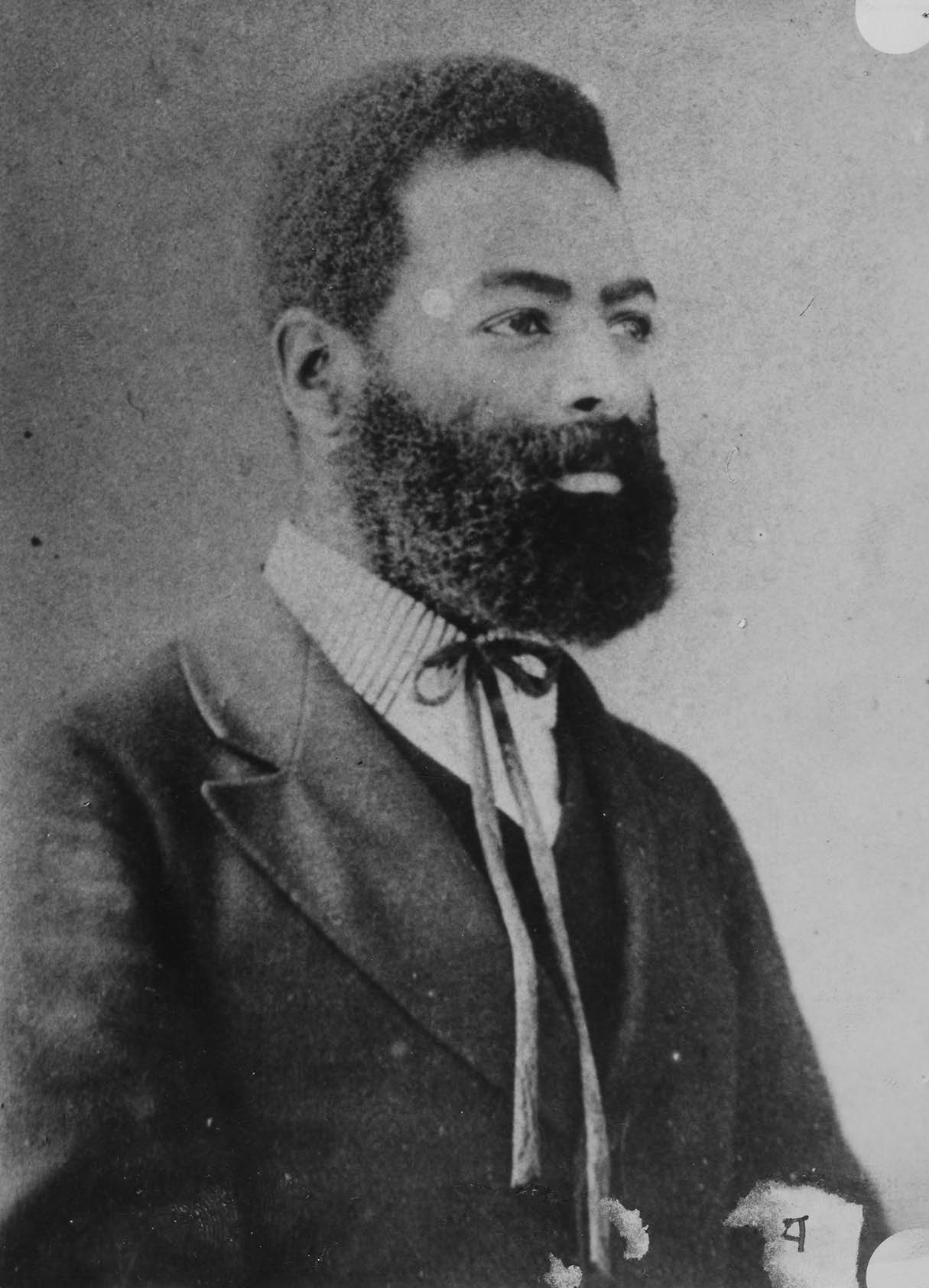
Gama, in about 1860

He builds, from the elements of white culture, the antithesis to the culture and civilization of the blacks, filling them with elements of traditional poetry; thus, he contrasts the "Guinea muse" to the Greco-Roman muses; the dark granite to the white marble; the marimba and the cabaço to the lyre and the flute:

Ó Musa da Guiné, cor de azeviche,
Estátua de granito denegrido,
(...)
Empresta-me o cabaço d'urucungo,
Ensina-me a brandir tua marimba (...)

Translation:

O Muse of Guinea, color of holly,
Statue of blackened granite,
(...)
Lend me your urucungo cabaço,
Teach me to wield your marimba (...)

In his verses, he traces an image of himself that is far from the figure of the "poor wretch" or sufferer that figures in the blacks painted by contemporary white poets like Castro Alves. Gama hits himself with the same fierce criticism with which he attacks the system, belittling his own value before the prevailing cultural standards, which he implicitly accepts:

Se queres, meu amigo,
No teu álbum pensamento
Ornado de frases finas,
Ditadas pelo talento;
Não contes comigo,
Que sou pobretão:
Em coisas mimosas
Sou mesmo um ratão.

Translation:

If you will, my friend,
In your thought record
Ornamented with fine phrases,
Dictated by talent;
Don't count on me
That I am a penniless man:
In pampering things
I'm a real rat.

Gama even ironizes the situation of the black man, cut off from wealth, the sciences, and the arts:

Ciências e letras
Não são para ti:
Pretinha da Costa
Não é gente aqui.

Translation:

Science and letters
Are not for you:
Little black girl da Costa
Isn't a person in this place.

=== Goat ===
"Goat" (Bode) was a term used in Gama's time to make pejorative references to black and pardo people, more specifically, "gathering of mixed-race people", and the poet himself was the target of these offenses. Thus, in 1861, in the poem Quem sou eu? also known as Bodarrada, Gama used the term ironically to satirize Brazilian society, while affirming human equality regardless of color:

Se negro sou, ou sou bode,
Pouca importa. O que isto pode?
Bodes há de toda a casta.
Pois que a espécie é muita vasta...
Há cinzentos, há rajados,
Baios, pampas e malhados,
Bodes negros, bodes brancos,
Bodes ricos, bodes pobres,
Bodes sábios, importantes,
E também alguns tratantes…
[...]
Haja paz, haja alegria,
folgue e brinque a bodaria;
cesse, pois, a matinada,
porque tudo é bodarrada!

Translation:

Whether I am black, or a goat,
It matters little. What can it?
There are all kinds of goats.
For the species is very wide...
There are gray ones, and there are striped ones,
There's bays, pampas and spotted,
Black goats, white goats,
Rich goats, poor goats,
Wise goats, important goats,
And also some rascals...
[...]
Let there be peace, let there be joy,
Let there be peace, let there be joy, let there be fun and frolic;
So let the revelry cease,
because everything is bodarrada!

== Abolitionist activism ==
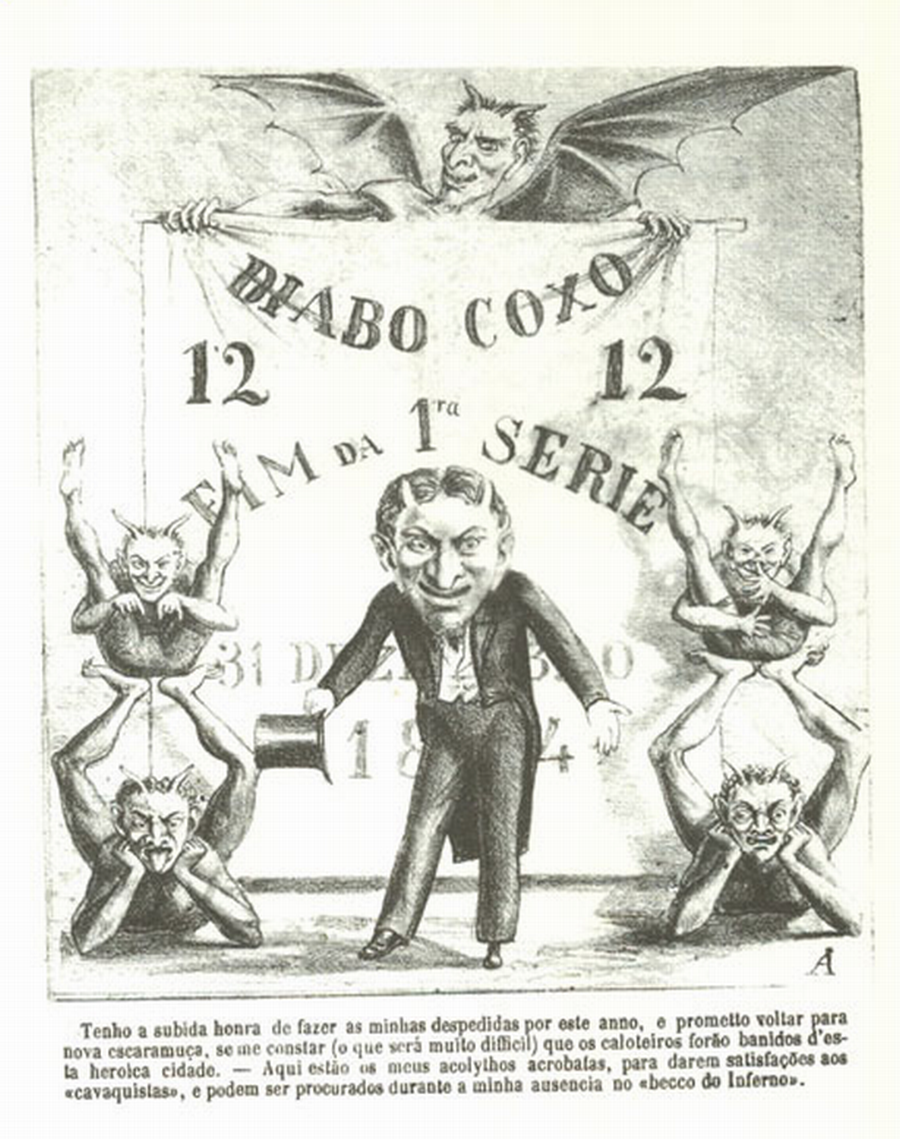
Diabo Coxo (dec/1864), founded by Gama and Agostini.

=== Journalism and Freemasonry ===
Part of Luís Gama's abolitionist activism resided in his activity in the press. He began his journalistic career in São Paulo, together with cartoonist Angelo Agostini; both founded, in 1864, the first illustrated humorous newspaper in that city, called Diabo Coxo (Lame Devil), which lasted from October 1864 until November 1865. Before this, however, he had been an apprentice printer at O Ipiranga and had worked in the editorial staff of Radical Paulistano. His actions as a journalist and lawyer, as early as 1869, had made him one of the most influential and popular figures in the city of São Paulo. Despite this, Gama did not become a rich man and kept what little money he had to donate to the needy who came to him. Luís Gama was the only black abolitionist in Brazil to have experienced slavery.

But Gama also wrote articles for other newspapers, in which he discoursed on socio-racial issues of Imperial Brazil. In an article entitled Foro de Belém de Jundiaí, published in Radical Paulistano, Gama denounces the decision of a judge who, after the death of a slave master, allowed the auction of a former slave who had been freed by his heir son. His journalistic and legal actions brought him many enemies, and the author Julio Emílio Braz even claims that Dioguinho was hired to assassinate him when Gama was nearing the end of his life, but a letter written to his son on September 23, 1870, makes it clear that he had been suffering threats against his life for some time.

In 1866, still with Agostini, now joined by Américo Brasílio de Campos, they founded the hebdomadário Cabrião; all three belonged to the same Masonic lodge, and shared the same republican and abolitionist ideals. The America Masonic Lodge was very active in the abolitionist cause; it was founded by Luís Gama and Ruy Barbosa and Joaquim Nabuco (who omits his Masonic background) may also have been a member. At the time of his death, Gama was the institution's Venerable Master.

One of his projects within the freemasonry was, in June 1869, through the America Lodge and together with Olímpio da Paixão, the creation of a free school for children and an evening primary school for adults in the 25 de Março Street. Historian Bruno Rodrigues de Lima also found a manuscript that presents the idea that Gama had been responsible for the creation of a community library with 5 thousand titles, something that was attributed to the Loja América, and his manifestos published in the newspaper "Democracia" demonstrate his commitment to a project of a public and secular school at least 30 years before the first debates on this subject.

=== The "Gama style" of judicial practice ===
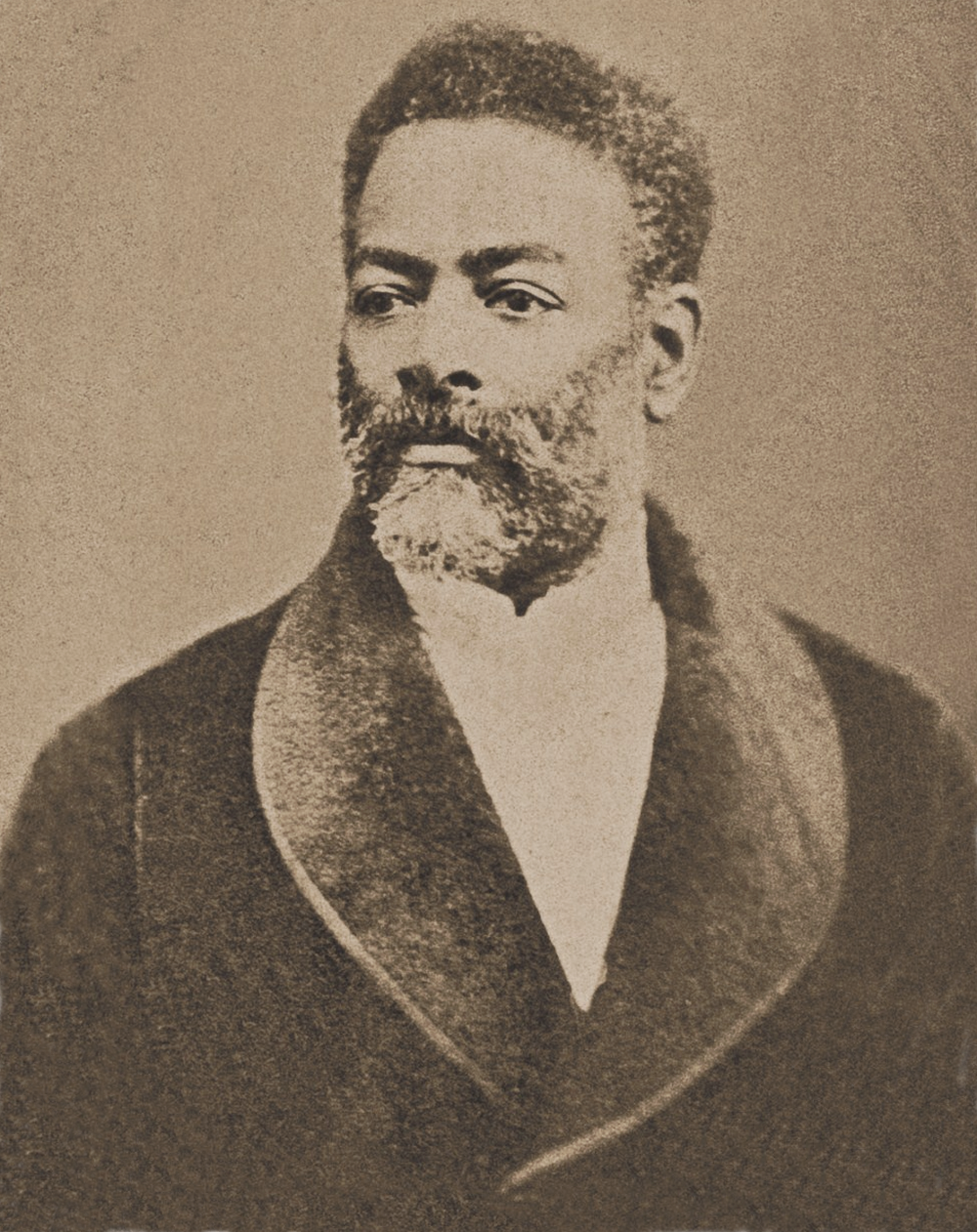
Gama, when older

In 1831, a law was passed that prohibited the importation of slaves into Brazil, making any trafficked individual free as soon as he or she arrived in the country. Called the Feijó Law, it became better known as a Law for the English to see, because it was a law passed to appease British pressure for the abolition of slavery in Brazil, without actually putting an end to the importation of slaves. Although it was not a law enforced by slave traders, it was the legal instrument by which Gama used to achieve the liberation of slaves. The so-called "Gama style" consisted of proving through legal proceedings that the enslaved blacks defended by Gama were brought illegally to Brazil, that is, after the promulgation of the Feijó Law in 1831, and should therefore be freed.

With the promulgation of the Lei do Ventre Livre (Free Womb Law) in 1871, Gama was able to get more freed slaves. In one of the items of the law, it was established the requirement of registration of each slave that a master owned. If the slave did not have a registration, it could be used as an argument for his alforria, as Gama did. Also, article 4 of the law formalized the purchase of the slave's manumission charter by the slave himself or by others, which allowed abolitionists to pass themselves off as slave valuers and lower the purchase price, allowing Gama and other abolitionists to buy more freedoms at lower prices.

Although he acted mainly in the defense of blacks accused of crimes, of those who fled or to seek their legal freedoms, he did not refuse to attend gracefully to the poor of any ethnicity, and there were cases in which he defended European immigrants injured by Brazilians. Gama also helped newly freed slaves find a job.

In his autobiographical letter to Lúcio de Mendonça, Gama estimates that he had already freed more than 500 slaves from captivity and in an 1869 court case known as the "Netto Question", Gama secured the freedom of 217 slaves, in an act regarded as the "largest known collective action to free slaves in the Americas," according to the BBC.

During a jury, Gama uttered a phrase that became famous: The slave who kills the master, in whatever circumstance, always kills in self-defense – this provoked such a reaction from those present that, with the confusion, the judge was forced to suspend the session. Historian Ligia Fonseca Ferreira says that this phrase actually appeared in the biography of Luís Gama written by Lúcio de Mendonça and published in the Almanaque Literário de São Paulo, explaining that "This phrase is not by Luiz Gama, it is by this white friend who wrote about him". An article in the Estado de São Paulo also says that Gama never wrote these words in exact, and historian Bruno Rodrigues de Lima says that this concept reappears several times in his work. In one example, in the Letter to Ferreira de Menezes dated December 18, 1880, when defending 4 slaves considered "four Spartacus" by Gama, who had murdered the son of their master Valeriano José do Vale, and had been executed by 300 people while inside the prison by "...the knife, the stick, the hoe, the axe...", Gama said:

...the slave who kills the master, who fulfills an inevitable prescription of natural right, and the unworthy people who murder heroes, will never be mixed.

An equivalent sentence was published on August 19, 1882, as the subtitle of the article "To the slavocrats", written by Raul Pompeia, in the Abolitionist Center's newspaper "ÇA IRA": "Before the Law, the crime of homicide perpetrated by the slave in the person of the master is justifiable".

==== Ethnic views ====
Luís Gama opposed African descendants whom he believed behaved like whites or became cruel slave owners themselves, and he thought it amusing to watch as slavers of demonstrably multi-ethnic origin attempted to pass themselves off as white. Concerning his father, he said, "My father, I dare not claim that he was white, because such claims, in this country, constitute grave danger before the truth". Colonel Teodoro Xavier hated Luís Gama for having already lost a slave to him, so he called him "Goat", trying to insult him, to which one day, the lawyer replied: "I am not a goat, I am black. My color does not deny it. A goat is your honor who intends to disguise, with this light color, the mulatto underneath".

=== Political activity ===
In his political activities Gama was affiliated to Liberal Party and before the Republican Manifesto he had already exposed his ideas in the article "The American Brazil and the lands of Cruzeiro without king or slaves" published on December 2, 1869. Later, Gama was part of the group that for the first time tried to found a republican party and on July 2, 1873, he came to participate in the First Republican Congress, already part of the Republican Party of São Paulo, where he found that the party and its members, many slave owners, did not care or interest themselves in the abolitionist agenda. Because he believed that abolition should be immediate and without compensation to the slaveholders, he left the party and started criticizing it in the media, and these criticisms also extended to newspapers that claimed to be in favor of the abolitionist cause, but published advertisements about the capture of slaves.

== Death and burial ==
The writer Raul Pompeia had already noticed that Gama's health was not good; three days before his death he had observed that Gama no longer climbed down the stairs of his office without support, resorting to the support of his friends Pedro, Brasil Silvado, or himself, Raul.

Gama had diabetes. On the morning of 24 August 1882 he had lost his speech and despite the intervention of more than 20 doctors, this was the causa mortis that victimized him that afternoon, certified by physician Jaime Perna.

When the great abolitionist and slave liberator had died, Raul Pompeia expressed his incredulity and, registering every moment of the funeral, he immediately went to his friend's house, where he verified that many people were already there, keeping vigil: in front of the house, men cried "like cowards", and ladies sobbed. His body had been placed in a coffin in the front room; a sculptor molded his face in plaster. The coffin left the next day at three o'clock in the afternoon. Just before the coffin was closed, the widow gave a painful cry. The cemetery was at the other end of town, and a funeral coach had been prepared to take him, but the crowd of people who had flocked there would not let him go: "Everyone's friend" – as he was known – would have to be "carried by everyone". Commerce had closed its doors and flowers were thrown to Gama.

The coffin appears, brought by friends of the deceased: journalist and member of the Centro Abolicionista Gaspar da Silva, Dr. Antônio Carlos, Dr. Pinto Ferraz, Conselheiro Duarte de Azevedo, among others; ahead of the coffin followed a huge crowd, like the one squeezed in beside, disputing the honor of carrying the coffin; behind, a large number of carriages and, among them, the empty funeral coach. At four hours and five minutes, the procession arrived at Brás, where a band was waiting to accompany it, playing sad chords; at Ladeira do Carmo, the Brotherhood of Nossa Senhora dos Remédios joined the burial; arriving at the "city", stores closed their doors and flags were flying at half-mast, while people crowded the streets where the burial was to take place; in the windows, families squeezed themselves to watch: all along the way, many mourned the loss.

Professor Otávio Torres recorded that Luís Gama died "glorified by São Paulo"; Antônio Loureiro de Sousa, in 1949, recorded: "His funeral was an unprecedented spectacle: it was the largest ever reported in those days. The crowd that followed the funeral cortege, with all silence and admiration, was forced to stop by the numerous speeches that interrupted the funeral procession". More recently, in 2013, article writer Zeca Borges declared that "his burial was the most emotional event in the history of the city of São Paulo".

People of all classes were there, and all vying for the chance to carry the skiff. At one point, the slave driver Martinho Prado Júnior carried on one side, and on the other, a haughty, "poor, ragged, barefooted black man", in Pompey's register. It was already evening when the procession finally arrived at the Consolação holy ground, and the crowd held its ground. After a brief stop for a sermon by a priest in the chapel, where the hundreds of wreaths of flowers were laid, the coffin was finally taken to the grave, where the crowd was waiting. Before lowering it, however, someone – the doctor Clímaco Barbosa or Antônio Bento, shouted for everyone to wait; after a brief speech in which he remembered the importance of Luís Gama, bringing everyone to tears, he summoned everyone to swear an oath not to let "die the idea for which that giant had fought": this was answered by a general roar from the crowd, which, hands extended to the coffin, swore.

His grave was purchased on the same day as the burial in the name of his wife Claudina, as recorded in Book 2, fols. 28, of the Municipal Archives; it is located on 2nd Street, grave 17.

=== Effects from the speeches ===
Gama's death and the engaged speech at his grave marked the end of this first phase of the abolitionist movement, markedly "legalistic" (constitution of funds for the acquisition of captives and their freedom, legal actions for liberation) and the beginning of the phase of effective actions to combat the slavers: led by Clímaco Barbosa, the campaign moved on to "de facto ways", where people took in runaway slaves, hiding them in their homes until they were sent to the Quilombo do Jabaquara, in Santos, and stimulating mass escape from the farms.

A milestone of this action was the invasion of Chácara Pari by members of the Brás Abolitionist Club, with cries of "Long live the abolitionists, let the slavocrats die!"; people such as Barbosa, Antônio Bento, Feliciano Bicudo, among other notables and anonymous, became part of the police's list of suspects.

In 1879, recognizing that his illness was worsening, Luís Gama began to consider radical methods and Antônio Bento, who had left his position as a judge to dedicate himself to the anti-slavery struggle was of paramount importance in this area and was later considered "the ghost of abolition". Antônio Bento inherited the position of lawyer for the Abolitionist Club upon Gama's death. Later came the Abolitionist Party and the Caifazes movement, led by Antônio Bento, who radicalized the abolitionist campaign in actions as described in the first paragraph of the topic, which made Antônio Bento the immediate continuator of Luís Gama's work.

== Homages and influences ==
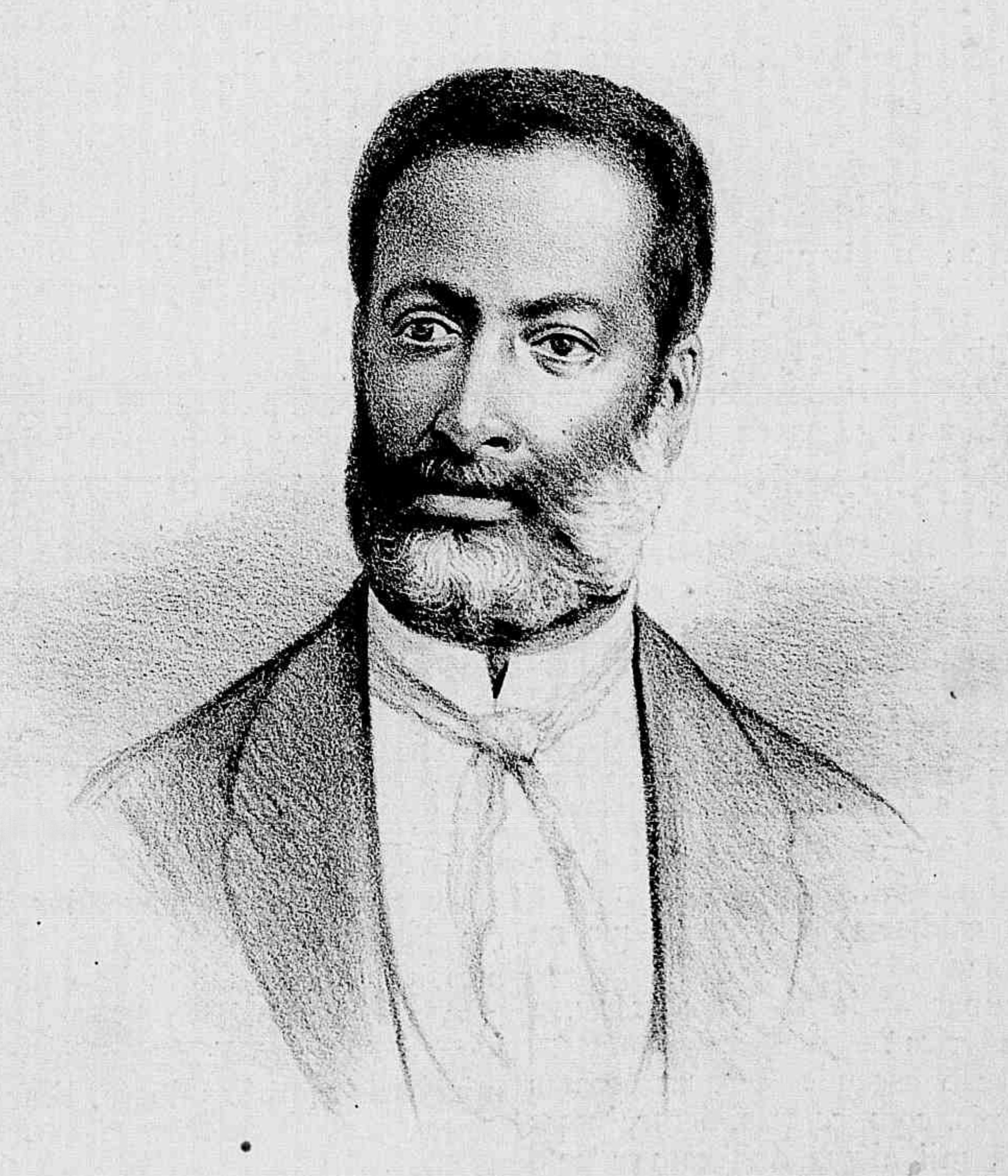
Drawing by Raul Pompeia, portraying Gama in O Mequetrefe.

Among his contemporaries Gama was the recipient of several tributes. Raul Pompeia, in the Gazeta de Notícias of September 10, 1882, wrote an article about him entitled Última página da vida de um grande homem (Last page in the life of a great man); the same author wrote a caricature of him, which was published that same year on the front page of the Rio de Janeiro newspaper O Mequetrefe in August (No. 284), and also the unfinished novella A Mão de Luís Gama (The Hand of Luís Gama), originally published on the pages of the Jornal do Commercio, of São Paulo (1883), and the text A Morte de Luíz Gama (The death of Luíz Gama). (Note: The last two full texts can be read in: Schmidt, Afonso. O Canudo. S. Paulo, Clube do Livro, 1963 – p. 83-136.)

Some years after his death, and following the Abolition, the Luís Gama Lodge was founded by the São Paulo Freemason Góes and the collaboration of brothers from the Trabalho and Ordem e Progresso lodges, with the initiation of 25 blacks.

In his honor, in 1919, the Sorocabana Railroad (currently FEPASA named one of its stations, today practically in ruins.

Between 1923 and 1926, in what may be considered the "second period of the black press" in the state of São Paulo, the newspaper Getulino appeared in the city of Campinas; in this city racism was stronger than in the state capital itself, and the publication was part of the movement for greater participation of blacks in society; its title was a "tribute to Luís Gama who had as one of his pseudonyms Getulino" and its influence would culminate in the creation of O Clarim da Alvorada, a newspaper in the São Paulo capital.

In Largo do Arouche, in São Paulo, there is a bust erected to his memory, erected on commission by the black community on the occasion of his centennial.

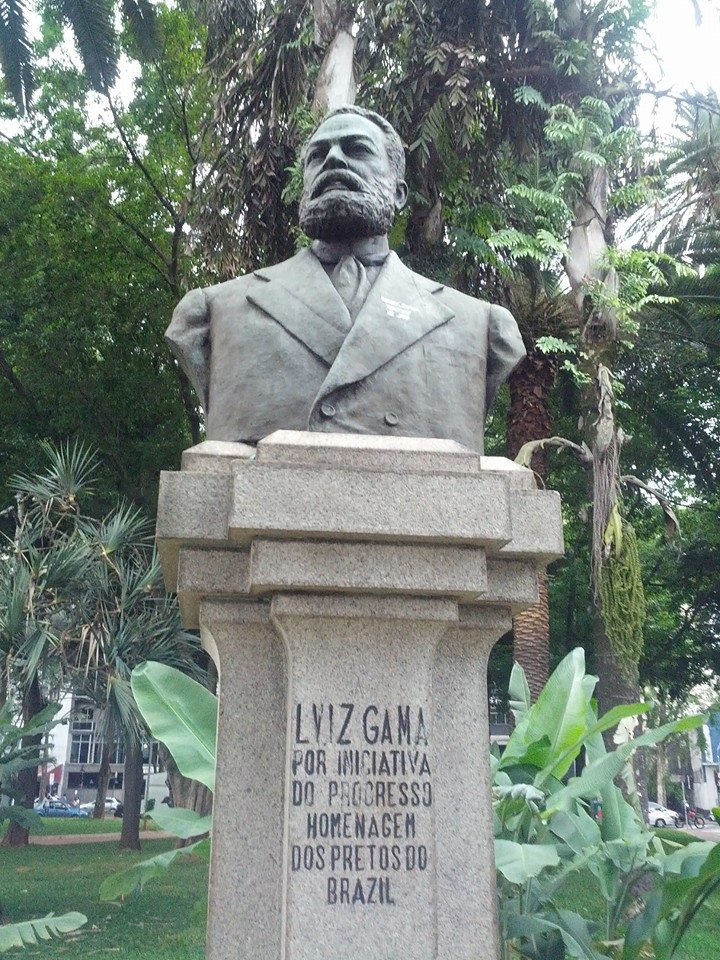
Bust of Gama, inaugurated in 1931, at Largo do Arouche

Over time it influenced several black Brazilian movements, such as the literary group Projeto Rhumor Negro of São Paulo, created in 1988, for whom Gama's letter to Mendonça is "one of the most important historical documents of the Brazilian people. (...) Given the magnitude of the life of this great man, this letter, crossing time, is also addressed to all of us".

In 2014, in the wake of the success of the movie 12 Years a Slave, writer Ana Maria Gonçalves, author of the novelized work about Gama's life Um Defeito de Cor (A Color Defect), prepared a script for a movie and also drawing the attention of Brazilian television – pointing out that very little is said about slavery compared to other historical facts, such as the holocaust during World War II. In 2015 the play "Luiz Gama — Uma voz pela liberdade" ("Luiz Gama – A Voice for Freedom") was started, with actor and scriptwriter Deo Garcez as the protagonist and actress Nivia Helen as narrator and various characters.

In 2015, the Ordem dos Advogados do Brasil conceded the title of attorney of law to Luis Gama in a ceremony in the Law School of Mackenzie Presbyterian University. This homage was proposed by Professor Silvio Almeida, President of Luiz Gama Institute, and nowadays Minister of Human Rights and Citizenship of Brazil.

In 2017, the University of São Paulo Law School, in Largo de São Francisco, named one of its rooms after him. In 2018 his name was inscribed in the Steel Book of national heroes deposited in the Tancredo Neves Pantheon of the Fatherland and Freedom and was recognized as a journalist by the São Paulo Journalists Union.

In 2019, it was announced that filmmaker Jefferson De would make a film on the life of Gama, with Fabrício Boliveira as the character in adulthood. The film, then in production, was temporarily titled Prisioneiro da Liberdade (Prisoner of Liberty), also would feature actors Caio Blat and Zezé Motta. The name of the film came to be Doutor Gama, with César Mello as the main character, and was released in 2021.

Also in 2019, the comic book Província Negra was published after winning the city of São Paulo's Fomento Cultural edict, portraying a fictional adventure based on the life of Gama, who takes on the role of the protagonist in the adventure. The script is by Kaled Kanbour and the art by Kris Zullo.

In 2021, the University of São Paulo posthumously awarded him an Honoris Causa doctorate, the first black Brazilian to receive this title from the university.

=== Title of "lawyer" ===
133 years after his death, on November 3, 2015, the Order of Attorneys of Brazil, São Paulo Section, granted him the title of "lawyer", since he was not trained and acted as a "provisioned" or abolitionist. The tribute ceremony, entitled "Luiz Gama: Ideas and Legacy of the Abolitionist Leader", included two days of events at Mackenzie Presbyterian University, through debates and lectures. The tribute is unprecedented in the history of the Order of Attorneys of Brazil; according to its national president, Marcus Vinicius Furtado Coêlho, "It is a very fitting tribute to someone who fought so hard for freedom, equality, and respect".

=== Image Abroad ===
The Black Past website, focused on global African and African American history, has a page with the poet's biography.

In March 2020, the workshop "Slavery, Freedom and Civil Law in the Brazilian Courts (1860–1888): How the Black Lawyer Luiz Gama Developed a Legal Doctrine that Freed Five Hundred Slaves" took place at Princeton University.

== Complete work ==
Historian Bruno Rodrigues de Lima, from the Max Planck Institute, spent nine years going through archives and registry offices looking for the complete works of Luís Gama, in a project for the publication of ten volumes and approximately 5,000 pages in Portuguese entitled Obras Completas [Complete Works (of Luiz Gama)], alongside the publisher Hedra. The project, published out of order, will be fully released by 2022.

Bruno Rodrigues has researched to create Luís Gama's timeline starting when he published his first text at the age of 19, and among his research findings is the fact that he was already recognized as a lawyer in his time, not a rábula- and that this denomination may have been created to diminish him.

- Luiz Gama (2021). Bruno Rodrigues de Lima (ed.). Democracia (1866–1869). Obras Completas (in Brazilian Portuguese). Vol. 4 (1 ed.). Hedra. p. 500. ISBN 9786589705123.
- Luiz Gama (2023). Bruno Rodrigues de Lima (ed.). Direito (1870–1875). Obras Completas (in Brazilian Portuguese). Vol. 5 (1 ed.). Hedra. p. 486. ISBN 978-8577157341.
- Luiz Gama (2023). Bruno Rodrigues de Lima (ed.). Crime (1877–1879). Obras Completas (in Brazilian Portuguese). Vol. 7 (1 ed.). Hedra. p. 380. ISBN 978-8577157334.
- Luiz Gama (2021). Bruno Rodrigues de Lima (ed.). Liberdade (1880–1882). Obras Completas (in Brazilian Portuguese). Vol. 8 (1 ed.). Hedra. p. 446. ISBN 9786589705161.

== Bibliography ==
=== Scientific papers ===
- Brandão, Roberto de Oliveira. "A Poesia Satírica de Luís Gama" (PDF). Boletim bibliográfico – Biblioteca Mario de Andrade (in Brazilian Portuguese). 49 (1/4): 8. Archived from the original (PDF) on 2014-02-04.
- Braga-Pinto, César (2014). "The Honor of the Abolitionist and the Shamefulness of Slavery: Raul Pompeia, Luís Gama and Joaquim Nabuco". Luso-Brazilian Review. 51 (2): 170–199. doi:10.1353/lbr.2014.0022. JSTOR 43905328. S2CID 143291913.
- Cruz, Ricardo Alexandre (2014). "A trajetória social e educacional do abolicionista Luís Gama: notas e anotações para a História da Educação brasileira". Travessias Revista (in Brazilian Portuguese). 8 (2).
- Kennedy, James H (1974). "Luiz Gama: Pioneer of Abolition in Brazil". The Journal of Negro History. 59 (3): 255–267. doi:10.2307/2716766. JSTOR 2716766. S2CID 149563641.
- Ferreira, Lígia Fonseca (2019). "Luiz Gama autor, leitor, editor: revisitando as Primeiras Trovas Burlescas de 1859 e 1861". Estudos Avançados (in Brazilian Portuguese). 33 (96): 109–136. doi:10.1590/s0103-4014.2019.3396.0008.
- Ferreira, Ligia Fonseca (2007). "Luiz Gama: um abolicionista leitor de Renan". Estud. Av. (in Brazilian Portuguese). 21 (60): 271–288. doi:10.1590/S0103-40142007000200021.
- Ferreira, Ligia Fonseca. "Luiz Gama por Luiz Gama: carta a Lúcio de Mendonça" (PDF). Teresa. Revista de Literatura Brasileira da USP (in Brazilian Portuguese) (8/9): 300–321. Archived from the original (PDF) on 2014-02-04.
- Martins, Heitor (1996). "Luis Gama e a consciência negra na literatura brasileira". Afro-Ásia (in Brazilian Portuguese) (17). Universidade Federal da Bahia. doi:10.9771/aa.v0i17.20858.
- Oliveira, Sílvio Roberto dos Santos (2005). "Luiz Gama, o poeta invísivel". Sínteses (in Brazilian Portuguese). 10.
- dos Santos, Jair Cardoso (2014). "Um olhar sobre a pedagogia de Luiz Gama: representações do negro no universo pré-adolescente" (PDF) (in Brazilian Portuguese): 12. Archived (PDF) from the original on 2021-08-30.

=== Books ===
- Alonso, Angela (2015). Flores, votos e balas: O movimento abolicionista brasileiro (1868–88) (in Brazilian Portuguese). Rio de Janeiro: Companhia das Letras.
- Azevedo, Elciene (1999). Orfeu de Carapinha: A trajetória de Luiz Gama na imperial cidade de São Paulo (in Brazilian Portuguese). São Paulo: Editora da Unicamp.
- Benedito, Mouzar (2011). Luiz Gama – o libertador de escravos e sua mãe libertária, Luíza Mahin (PDF) (in Brazilian Portuguese) (2 ed.). São Paulo: Expressão Popular. p. 80. ISBN 978-85-7743-004-8. Archived from the original (PDF) on 2021-08-27.
- Câmara, Nelson (2010). Advogado Dos Escravos (in Brazilian Portuguese). São Paulo: Lettera doc.
- Gama, Luís; Ferreira, Lígia (2000). Primeiras trovas burlescas e outros poemas (in Brazilian Portuguese). São Paulo: Martins Fontes.
- Kinsbruner, Jay.; Langer, Erick Detlef. (2008). Encyclopedia of Latin American history and culture (2 ed.). Detroit: Gale. ISBN 9780684312705. OCLC 191318189.
- Lima, Bruno Rodrigues de. Luiz Gama contra o Império: A luta pelo direito no Brasil da Escravidão. São Paulo: Editora Contracorrente, 2024
- Menucci, Sud (1938). O Precursor do Abolicionismo no Brasil: Luís Gama (PDF) (in Brazilian Portuguese). São Paulo: Companhia Editora Nacional.
- Pinto, Ana Flávia Magalhães. Escritos da liberdade: literatos negros, racismo e cidadania no Brasil oitocentista. Campinas, SP: Editora da Unicamp, 2018
- Santos, Luiz Carlos (2014). Luiz Gama (in Brazilian Portuguese). Selo Negro Edições.
- Silva, J. Romão (1954). Luís da Gama e suas Poesias Satíricas (in Brazilian Portuguese). Rio de Janeiro: Casa do Estudante do Brasil.
- "First burlesque ballads by Gaetulian, 1861" (PDF). Classics and Race. UCL Press. 2025-04-24. pp. 223–257. doi:10.14324/111.9781800088139. ISBN 978-1-80008-813-9.

== Additional reading ==
- Encyclopedia of African-American culture and history : the Black experience in the Americas. Palmer, Colin A., 1944– (2nd ed.). Detroit: Macmillan Reference USA. 2006. ISBN 0028658213. OCLC 60323165. - Used in the article body on oldid=1039809695
- Encyclopedia of emancipation and abolition in the Transatlantic world. Rodriguez, Junius P.,, Ackerson, Wayne. London [England]. 2015-03-26. ISBN 978-1317471790. OCLC 908062295. - Used in the article body on oldid=1039809695
- Santos, Eduardo Antonio Estevam (December 2015). "Luiz Gama and the racial satire as the transgression poetry: diasporic poetry as counter-narrative to the idea of race". Almanack (11): 707–727. doi:10.1590/2236-463320151108. ISSN 2236-4633. - Used in the article body on oldid=1039809695
