= Esperança Garcia =

Enslaved Afro-Brazilian petitioner (born c. 1751)

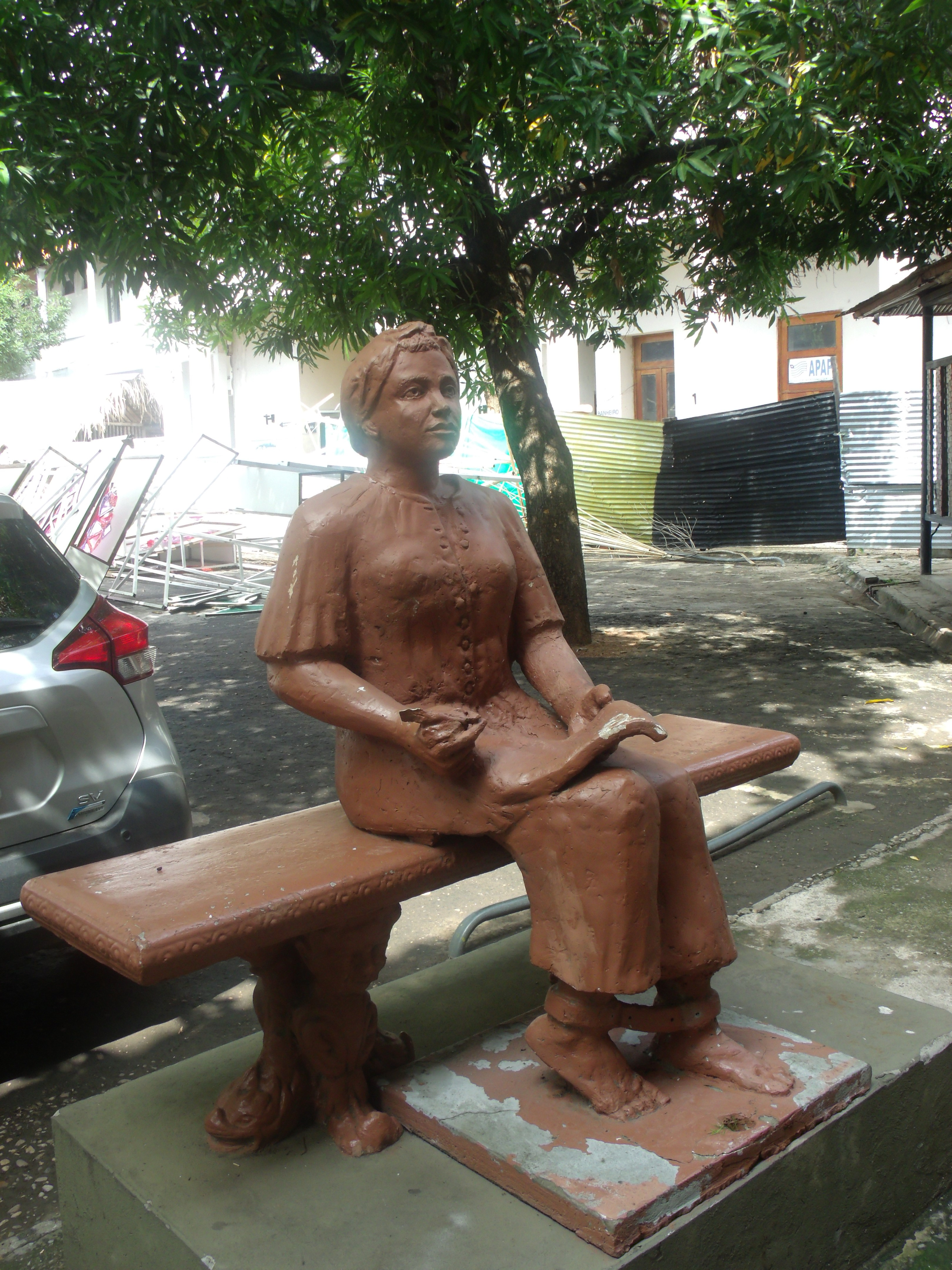
- Statue of Garcia at Central de Artesanato Mestre Dezinho, Teresina
- Born: c. 1751; Fazenda Algodões, Colonial Brazil

Esperança Garcia (born c. 1751) was an enslaved Afro-Brazilian and likely Creole woman in Brazil who is considered to have written the first earliest known slave petition in Brazil. On 6 September 1770, she sent a petition to free herself from slavery to the then-president of the province of São José do Piauí, Captaincy of Maranhão (now the current day state of Piauí), Gonçalo Pereira Botelho de Castro. In the petition, she denounced the abuse and maltreatment of her and her son by the overseer of Fazenda Algodões.

== Biography ==
=== Early life ===
Garcia was born on a plantation called Fazenda Algodões, owned by the Jesuits in what is now the town of Nazaré do Piauí. While there is no existing documentation of her birth or death date, she is believed to have been born at around 1751. She was also likely Creole. It was on this Jesuit plantation where she learned how to read and write. At the age of 9, with the order made by the Marquis de Pombal, she was expelled from Brazil and was forcibly taken as a slave to the house of captain Antônio Vieira de Couto. Her duties as a slave included making flour, cleaning cotton, weaving hammocks, and extracting castor oil for the purpose of making lamps. She married an Angolan named Ignácio Garcia, who was 30 years older than her, and the pair had at least 2 children together. She was a practicing Catholic.

=== Adulthood ===
On 6 September 1770, she penned a letter to the president of the province of São José do Piauí, Gonçalo Pereira Botelho de Castro, denouncing the abuse she had suffered and petitioning to free herself from slavery. She described her life while as a slave “very unhappy”, and claims that she and her first son were beaten. She had asked, among other things, to return to Fazenda Algodões to have her daughter baptized there.

The petition she wrote to the governor is considered the first letter written by a woman in the modern-day state of Piauí, which came to be a precursor to advocacy work in the state.

She fled a little after the petition was sent, reappearing in a list of forcibly enslaved people at Fazenda Algodões. The list, dated 1778, showed that she married Ignácio, who was of Angolan origin, and had 2 children.

=== Legacy ===
In 1979, Esperanca’s letter was rediscovered, and she became an icon for the black movement in Piauí, a state in Brazil. Her letter is also considered an important work to the origins of Afro-Brazilian women's literature. In the state of Piauí, the day she sent the letter, 6 September, is commemorated as Black Consciousness Day in the state.

A biography about her was written by author Jarid Arraes as part of her 2015 cordel collection and book Heroínas Negras Brasileiras em 15 cordéis.

In 2017, the Zumbi dos Palmares Memorial, a space dedicated to Black culture in the state capital of Teresina, was renovated and renamed the Esperança Garcia Memorial.

In 2019, she was inducted into the Book of Steel at the Pantheon of the Fatherland, which commemorates and honors national heroes. The legislation to do so was put forth by federal deputy Margarete Coelho of Piauí.

In 2019 as well, the Estação Primeira de Mangueira samba school in Rio de Janeiro made an homage to Garcia's memory in their 2019 song "História pra Ninar Gente Grande". She was honored again by the Em Cima da Hora samba school in 2023.

Many organizations founded by Afro-Brazilian women in Piauí bear Garcia’s name.
