= Ana Maria Gonçalves =

Brazilian writer

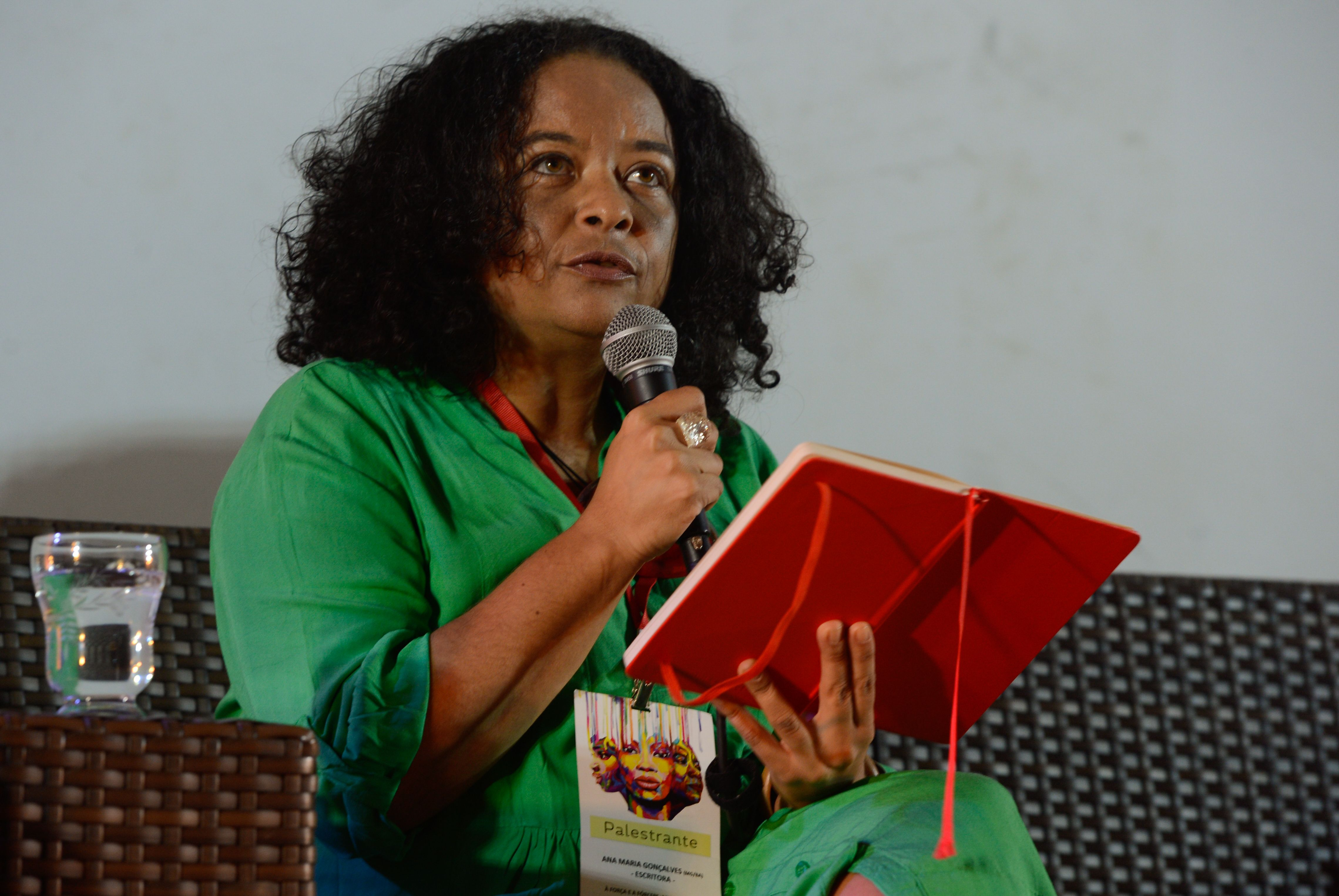
- During the Festival Latinidades in 2014
- Born: 1970 (age 55–56); Ibiá, Minas Gerais, Brazil
- Writing career
- Genre: novel

Ana Maria Gonçalves (born 1970) is a Brazilian writer and the first black woman to join the Brazilian Academy of Letters.

== Life ==
Gonçalves was born in Ibiá, Minas Gerais in 1970. She worked as an English teacher and as a publicist in São Paulo, before deciding to pursue writing full-time, in 2012. Later that year she published her first novel. Ao lado e à margem do que sentes por mim ("Beside and at the edge of what you feel for me"). In 2006, she published the novel Um defeito de cor ("A color defect"); it received the Casa de las Américas Prize for the category Brazilian literature in 2007. In 2009, she was included in a list published by the newspaper O Globo of the best Brazilian books from the previous decade. Her short stories have been included in anthologies published in Portugal and Italy.

Gonçalves was writer in residence at Tulane University in 2007, at Stanford University in 2008 and at Middlebury College in 2009. As of 2019, she was living in New Orleans.

In 2015, an adaptation of the book A Color Defect was announced for a television series, scheduled for release in 2021.

In December 2016, Ana Maria Gonçalves became a columnist on racial, cultural and political issues for The Intercept Brazil.

On 10 July 2025, she was elected to occupy the Chair number 33 at the Brazilian Academy of Letters, in succession to Evanildo Bechara.

== Works and Cultural Influence ==
Gonçalves' first novel, Ao lado e à margem do que sentes por mim, was published independently.

Her second novel, Um Defeito de Cor, was published in 2007 to widespread critical acclaim. Fellow writer Millôr Fernandes considered it the most important work published in Brazil in the XXI century, and it won prestigious awards such as the Casa de las Américas Prize. The novel is a fictionalization of the life of Luísa Mahin, a 19th-century woman that participated in the Malê revolt, the largest Slave rebellion in Brazilian history, as well as the Sabinada, a revolt against the imperial government. The novel was praised for its portrayal of the multicultural life in Salvador, Bahia, as well as in Brazilian communities in Benin and Nigeria.

The novel was adapted as a Samba, becoming the topic of the presentation made by Portela (samba school) in the Rio Carnival. Gonçalves was also awarded the Order of Rio Branco medal by the Brazilian government for her service to anti-racism.

== Bibliography ==
Novels

2002 - Ao lado e à margem do que sentes por mim

2006 - Um defeito de cor

Theater

2016 - Tchau, Querida!

2017 - Chão de Pequenos (Companhia Negra de Teatro)
