= Luísa Mahin =

19th century former slave

Luísa Mahin (born in the early 19th century) was a formerly enslaved woman of African origin. A controversial character, she is believed to have taken part in the organization of the slave uprisings that shook the province of Bahia in the first decades of the nineteenth century. She was supposedly a major player and strategist in the Malê Revolt, in which she helped inform the others involved through written communications in Arabic.

However, there is no historical evidence of her participation in the revolts, which leads some historians to consider her a kind of alter ego of her son, the abolitionist poet Luís Gama.

== Biography ==
Her origins are uncertain. It is not known whether she was born in the Costa da Mina in Africa or in Bahia. A member of the Mahi cultural group, from which her surname comes, Luísa Mahin bought her own freedom in 1812. Her son Luís Gama described her as a short, thin, pretty woman with teeth "as white as snow," proud, generous, long-suffering and vengeful.

== Legacy ==
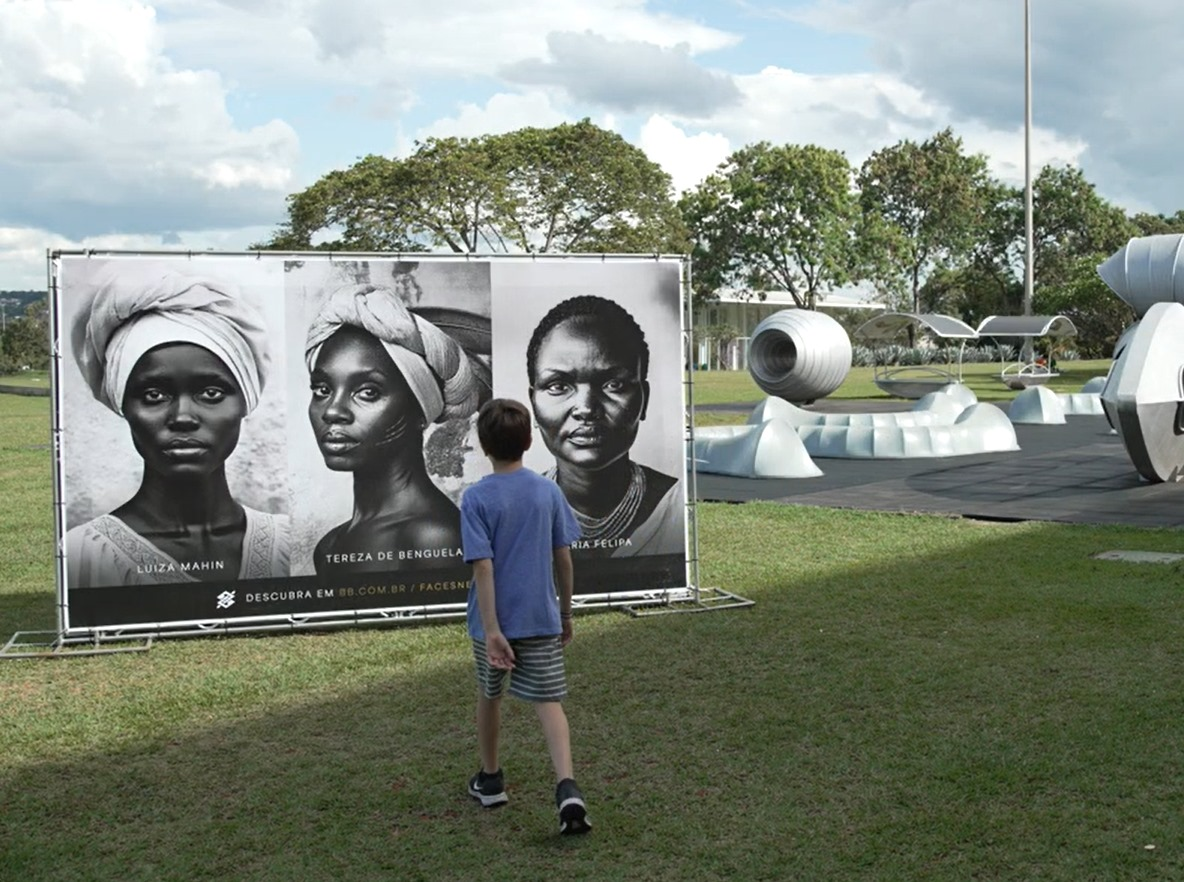
Exhibition on Tereza de Benguela, Luiza Mahin, and Maria Felipa at CCBB – Centro Cultural Banco do Brasil.

A biography about her was written by author Jarid Arraes as part of her 2015 cordel collection and book Heroínas Negras Brasileiras em 15 cordéis.
