= Black and Brown: African Americans and the Mexican Revolution, 1910–1920 =

Non-fiction book by Gerald Horne

- Author: Gerald Horne
- Language: English
- Subject: African American history, Mexican American history, Mexican Revolution
- Genre: Non-fiction, history
- Publisher: NYU Press
- Publication date: 2005
- Pages: 288
- ISBN: 978-0814736739
- Website: Book page at NYU Press

Black and Brown: African Americans and the Mexican Revolution, 1910–1920 is a book by Gerald Horne, published in 2005 by NYU Press.

== About ==
Black and Brown explores the lives and experiences of African Americans living in the southern United States borderlands with Mexico during the Mexican Revolution from 1910 to 1920, how the revolution affected them, and how they impacted the revolution.

Horne's account sheds light on the political climate that made the Mexican border a relatively safe location for African Americans before it became dangerous during the Revolutionary period. The examination covers the involvement of African Americans in conflicts with indigenous populations, the dynamics between African Americans and immigrants, and the U.S. government's concerns about the allegiance of African Americans. He also explores the heavy reliance of the U.S. on African American soldiers along the border and how this resulted in a struggle between white supremacy and national security.

The book is arranged chronologically into chapters, each looking at a different and progressive aspect of African American life along the border.

== Reviews ==
- Jacoby, Karl (2007). "Racial Borders and Historical Borderlands: African Americans in Latin America". Diplomatic History. 31 (3): 571–574. doi:10.1111/j.1467-7709.2007.00632.x. JSTOR 24916090.
- Leiker, James N. (2006). "Reviewed work: Black and Brown: African Americans and the Mexican Revolution, 1910–1920, Gerald Horne". The Journal of American History. 92 (4): 1456. doi:10.2307/4485959. JSTOR 4485959.
- Williams, Gershom (2007). "Reviewed work: Black and Brown: African Americans and the Mexican Revolution, 1910–1920, Gerald Horne". The Journal of African American History. 92 (1): 128–129. doi:10.1086/JAAHv92n1p128. JSTOR 20064163.
- Krauthamer, Barbara (2007). "Reviewed work: Black and Brown: African Americans and the Mexican Revolution, 1910–1920, Gerald Horne". Social History. 32 (1): 117. JSTOR 4287417.
- Levinson, Irving W. (2007). "Reviewed work: Black and Brown: African Americans and the American Revolution, 1910–1920, Gerald Horne". The American Historical Review. 112 (2): 555–556. doi:10.1086/ahr.112.2.555. JSTOR 4136712.

== Citation ==
- Horne, G. (2005). Black and Brown: African Americans and the Mexican Revolution, 1910–1920. NYU Press. ISBN 978-0-8147-3673-9.

== About the author ==
Gerald Horne is Moores Professor of History and African American Studies at the University of Houston.

== See also ==
- Becoming Mexican American: Ethnicity, Culture, and Identity in Chicano Los Angeles, 1900-1945
- Cannery Women, Cannery Lives: Mexican Women, Unionization, and the California Food Processing Industry, 1930-1950
