= Gerald Horne =

American historian (born 1949)

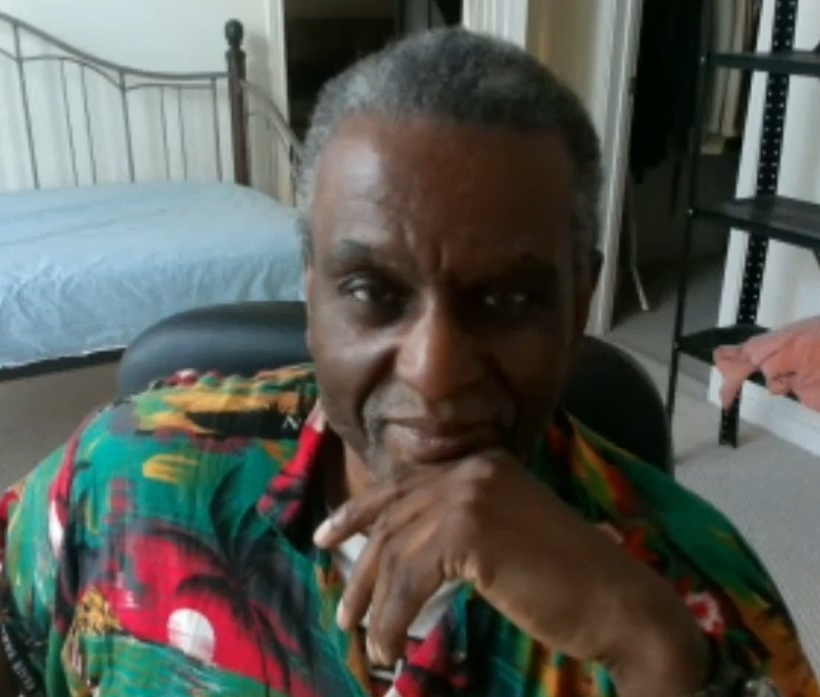
- Horne in 2020
- Born: January 3, 1949 (age 77); St. Louis, Missouri, U.S.
- Education: Princeton University (B.A.); Columbia University (Ph.D.); University of California, Berkeley (J.D.)
- Occupations: Professor, writer
- Writing career
- Subjects: Social & cultural analysis of race and class; class and race history

Gerald Charles Horne III (born January 3, 1949) is an American historian, author and attorney who holds the John J. and Rebecca Moores Chair of History and African American Studies at the University of Houston. In 2022, Horne was awarded the American Book Award for his book, The Dawning of the Apocalypse: The Roots of Slavery, White Supremacy, Settler Colonialism and Capitalism in the Long 16th Century, which was published by Monthly Review Press in 2020. Horne was also awarded the Frantz Fanon Lifetime Achievement Award in 2023.

== Background ==
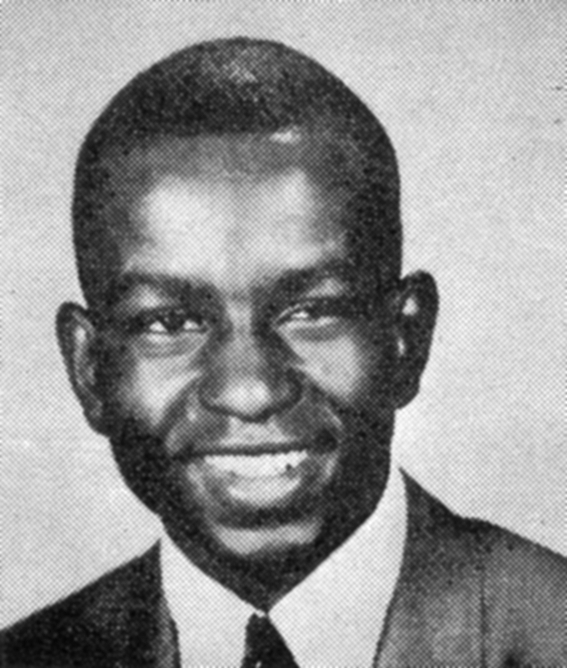
Horne in the Princeton University yearbook, 1970

Gerald Horne was raised in St. Louis, Missouri. After his undergraduate education at Princeton University, he received his Ph.D. from Columbia University and a J.D. from the University of California, Berkeley.

== Career ==
Horne holds the John J. and Rebecca Moores Chair of History and African American Studies at the University of Houston.

He has taught at Ramapo College (1975–1979), City College of New York (1980–1981), Sarah Lawrence College (1982–1988), University of California, Santa Barbara (1988–1996), University of Zimbabwe (1995), University of North Carolina at Chapel Hill (1995–2003), and University of Hong Kong (1999–2000).

He was the chair of the Department of Black Studies at UC Santa Barbara from 1988 to 1993 and the director of the Center for Black Studies (1990–1991).

He was a contributing editor of Political Affairs magazine.

In the 1990s, he was the host of WBAI-FM's Behind the News and Monday Talk Back.

From 2013 to date, Horne has discussed his historical, socio-economic and political research findings in a series of conversations with Paul Jay.

As of 2022 to the present, Horne has frequently appeared on the De Facto Podcast with Anthony Ballas to discuss his historiographical, political, economic, and cultural analyses for a series dedicated to his life and work.

Gerald Horne is also a frequent guest on the YouTube Channel, The Activist News Network, including an 11-part biography series of Dr. Horne, and the weekly Internationalist news update featuring Gerald Horne, entitled: "Around The Horne!"

As of 2026, he is a co-producer of and contributor to Freedom Now a Pan-African radio show on Pacifica Radio's KPFK in Los Angeles.

== Politics ==
Horne served as special counsel for Local 1199, the Drug Hospital and Health Care Employees Union from 1986 to 1988 in New York.

In 1992, Horne was a candidate for United States Senate in California on the Peace and Freedom Party ticket.

== Writing ==
Horne has published extensively on W. E. B. Du Bois and has written books on neglected episodes of world history including Hawaii and the Pacific. He writes about topics he perceives as misrepresented struggles for justice; in particular communist struggles and struggles against imperialism, colonialism, fascism, racism, and white supremacy. Horne is a Marxist. Much of his work highlights and analyzes specific individuals in their historical contexts, including figures such as the blacklisted Hollywood screenwriter John Howard Lawson, Ferdinand Smith (a Jamaican-born communist, sailor, labor leader, and co-founder of the National Maritime Union), and Lawrence Dennis, a man described as "the brains behind American fascism".

While many of Horne's books use an individual as a prism to inspect the historical forces of their times, Horne has also produced broad canvas chronicles of infrequently examined periods and aspects of the history of white supremacy and imperialism. For example, he has written on the post-civil war involvement of the US ruling class—newly dispossessed of human chattels—in relation to slavery in Brazil, which was not legally abolished until 1888. He has also written on the historic relationships between African Americans and the Japanese in the mid-20th century, specifically examining the ways in which the Japanese state gained sympathy and solidarity from people of colour by positioning themselves as the leaders of a global war against white supremacy.

One of Horne's more notable claims is that the American Revolution was, contrary to conventional Marxist theory which identifies it as a bourgeois revolution, a counter-revolution whose primary goal was to counteract the anticipated abolition of slavery in the British Empire. Horne has applied this framework of counter-revolution to other conflicts as well, including the Glorious Revolution (in his account, a revolt of merchants seeking to overcome the Royal African Company's regulations on slavery), the Texas Revolution (a rebellion against the Mexican government's anti-slavery stance and ambivalent indigenous policy), and the American Civil War. According to David Waldstreicher, Horne's framework aims to develop a "grand theory of US history" as a series of devastating counter-revolutions which continue into the present.

Manning Marable has said: "Gerald Horne is one of the most gifted and insightful historians on racial matters of his generation."

Following the Russian invasion of Ukraine in February 2022, Horne published an article which attributed the invasion to NATO enlargement, imperialism, and pro-Western regime change in Ukraine.

== Historiography in and for the radical tradition ==
At the Black Women and the Radical Tradition conference held at the Brooklyn College Graduate Center for Worker Education, in a session devoted to Shirley Graham Du Bois, he said:

The purpose of my brief remarks this afternoon is to use the life and times of Shirley Graham Du Bois as a vehicle for trying to understand how and why we need to think about revitalizing the radical tradition through the means of revisioning and rewriting our history, our past. I argue in these remarks that like other historians – for Shirley Graham Du Bois was among other things an historian – she tended to stress in her history writing, like most of the writers of her generation, the "Crispus Attucks" aspect of our history, I'm sure you're familiar with Crispus Attucks, he goes down in history as the first person to be slain in the uprising against British rule in then-British North America and a symbol of how black people have shed their blood to help to construct this country. Which of course is true and is accurate. But it only begins to tell part of the story, as I'll try to elaborate on in my remarks. I think today it's particularly important to talk about revitalizing our past so that we can reinvigorate the radical tradition in light of this precipitous downturn that we see in the capitalist economy. Newsweek has been amongst the many journals that have told us "We're All Socialists Now", which some might be surprised to hear. In Latin America, certainly in the most recent election in El Salvador, and in Latin American generally, one can easily espy a shift to the left. The quipsters are suggesting that the recently departed Pres. George W. Bush entered office in 2001 as a social conservative but then after being compelled to nationalize various enterprises he leaves office as a conservative socialist. When you note that in South Africa you have a Communist Party minister sitting in office in Pretoria, and perhaps the same will take place in New Delhi, after the elections that take place in the late spring, it's time to revive that aspect it seems to me reality is shouting at us, time to revitalize that aspect of black history that stresses our ancestors who as early as the 18th century were actually trying to overthrow the government of the United States of America, as opposed to shedding their blood to help to create the government of the United States of America.

In a speech given at an event marking the depositing of the Communist Party USA archives at the Tamiment Library at New York University, Horne remarked at length on the writing of history, its importance, and what he perceives as the grievous proliferation of propagandistic historiography in the US:

Now it is often said that every generation has to rewrite history. For example, at one time there was a prevalent "moonlight and magnolias" version of slavery and Reconstruction that fundamentally portrayed "happy Negroes" during the slave era and portrayed the period following slavery as a dastardly period of Negro misrule and corruption. This began to change in the 1930s with the publication of Du Bois' magisterial 'Black Reconstruction' and changed decisively with the publication of Eric Foner's 'Reconstruction.'"

One of the reasons why I personally – and I daresay future generations – are so pleased by the depositing of these CPUSA archives is because it is painfully obvious that the history of the Communist movement in this nation is long overdue for a massive rewriting and these archives will prove indispensable in that process.

It is easy to see why future generations will be displeased with much of the present history that has been written to this point about the Communist Party because it has been incredibly biased, one-sided, deeply influenced by the conservative drift of the nation – not unlike pre-Du Bois histories of Reconstruction – and, fundamentally, anticommunist.

== Works ==
- Black and Red: W.E.B. Du Bois and the Afro-American Response to the Cold War. SUNY Press (1986)
- Communist Front? The Civil Rights Congress, 1946–1956. Fairleigh Dickinson University Press (1987)
- "Thinking & Rethinking U.S. History". New York: CIBC (1988)
- "Studies in Black: Progressive Views of the African-American Experience". Thousand Oaks: Kendall-Hunt (1992)
- "Reversing Discrimination: The Case for Affirmative Action". New York: International Publishers (1992)
- Black Liberation/Red Scare: Ben Davis and the Communist Party. University of Delaware Press (1994)
- "Race for the Planet: The U.S. & the New World Order". Thousand Oaks: Kendall-Hunt (1994)
- "Testaments of Courage: Selections from Men's Slave Narratives". New York: Franklin Watts (1995)
- Fire This Time: The Watts Uprising And The 1960s. Da Capo Press (1997)
- "Powell v. Alabama: The Scottsboro Boys and American Justice". New York: Franklin Watts (1997)
- From the Barrel of a Gun: The United States and the War against Zimbabwe, 1965–1980. University of North Carolina Press (2000)
- Class Struggle in Hollywood, 1930–1950 : Moguls, Mobsters, Stars, Reds and Trade Unionists. University of Texas Press (2001)
- "W.E.B. Du Bois: An Encyclopedia". Westport: Greenwood (2001)
- Race Woman: The Lives of Shirley Graham Du Bois. New York University Press (2002)
- Co-Editor, "Encyclopedia of African American History, 1896 to the Present: From the Age of Segregation to the Twenty-First Century". New York: Oxford University Press (2008)Horne, Gerald (2004). Race War!: White Supremacy and the Japanese Attack on the British Empire. New York University Press. ISBN 9780814736418. JSTOR j.ctt9qg215. (2004)
- Black and Brown: African Americans and the Mexican Revolution, 1910–1920. New York University Press (2005)
- The Final Victim of the Blacklist: John Howard Lawson, Dean of the Hollywood Ten. University of California Press (2006)
- Cold War in a Hot Zone: The United States Confronts Labor and Independence Struggles in the British West Indies. Temple University Press (2007)
- The White Pacific: U.S. Imperialism and Black Slavery in the South Seas After the Civil War. University of Hawaii Press (2007)
- The Deepest South: The United States, Brazil, and the African Slave Trade. New York University Press (2007)
- Blows Against the Empire: U.S. Imperialism in Crisis. International Publishers (2008)
- Red Seas: Ferdinand Smith and Radical Black Sailors in the United States and Jamaica. New York University Press (2009)
- Mau Mau in Harlem?: The U.S. and the Liberation of Kenya. Palgrave MacMillan (2009)
- The Color of Fascism: Lawrence Dennis, Racial Passing, and the Rise of Right-Wing Extremism in the United States. New York University Press (2009)
- W.E.B. Du Bois: A Biography. Greenwood Press (2009)
- The End of Empires: African Americans and India. Temple University Press (2009)
- Fighting in Paradise: Labor Unions, Racism, and Communists in the Making of Modern Hawaii. University of Hawaii Press (2011)
- Negro Comrades of the Crown: African Americans and the British Empire Fight the U.S. Before Emancipation. New York University Press (2013)
- Black Revolutionary: William Patterson & the Globalization of the African American Freedom Struggle. University of Illinois Press (2013)
- The Counter-Revolution of 1776: Slave Resistance and the Origins of the United States of America. New York University Press (2014)
- Race to Revolution: The U.S. and Cuba during Slavery and Jim Crow. Monthly Review Press (2014)
- Confronting Black Jacobins: The U.S., the Haitian Revolution and the Origins of the Dominican Republic. Monthly Review Press (2015)
- Paul Robeson: The Artist as Revolutionary. Pluto Press (2016)
- The Rise and Fall of the Associated Negro Press: Claude Albert Barnett's Pan-African News and the Jim Crow Paradox. University of Illinois Press (2017)
- Storming the Heavens: African Americans and the Early Struggle for the Right to Fly. Black Classic Press (2017)
- Facing the Rising Sun: African Americans, Japan, and the Rise of Afro-Asian Solidarity. New York University Press (2018)
- The Apocalypse of Settler Colonialism: The Roots of Slavery, White Supremacy, and Capitalism in Seventeenth-Century North America and the Caribbean. Monthly Review Press (2018)
- Jazz and Justice: Racism and the Political Economy of the Music. Monthly Review Press (2019)
- White Supremacy Confronted: U.S. Imperialism and Anti-Communism vs. the Liberation of Southern Africa from Rhodes to Mandela. International Publishers (2019)
- "W.E.B. Du Bois: A Life in American History, with Charisse Burden-Stelly". Santa Barbara: ABC-CLIO (2019)
- The Dawning of the Apocalypse: The Roots of Slavery, White Supremacy, Settler Colonialism, and Capitalism in the Long Sixteenth Century. Monthly Review Press (2020)
- The Bittersweet Science: Racism, Racketeering, and the Political Economy of Boxing. International Publishers (2020)
- The Counter-Revolution of 1836: Texas Slavery & Jim Crow and the Roots of U.S. Fascism. International Publishers (2022)
- Revolting Capital: Racism & Radicalism in Washington D.C., 1900–2000. International Publishers (2023)
- "Acknowledging Radical Histories: Conversations With Gerald Horne, (with Chris Steele)". New York: International Publisher (2023)
- Armed Struggle? Panthers and Communists; Black Nationalists and Liberals in Southern California through the Sixties and Seventies. International Publishers (2024)
- "I Dare Say: A Gerald Horne Reader". OR Books (2024)
- The Capital of Slavery: Washington, D.C. 1800–1865. International Publishers (2025)
- "Blows Against the Empire: U.S. Imperialism in Crisis" (2nd ed.). International Publishers (2025)
- "The Counter-Revolution of 1893: The Hawaii Coup and the Roots of U.S. Imperialism in the Asia-Pacific Basin". New York: International Publishers (2026)
- "Slavery, the Slave Trade and the Roots of U.S. Imperialism". International Publishers (2026)

== See also ==
- Black and Brown: African Americans and the Mexican Revolution, 1910–1920
- The Dawning of the Apocalypse: The Roots of Slavery, White Supremacy, Settler Colonialism, and Capitalism in the Long Sixteenth Century
- List of African-American United States Senate candidates
