= The Dawning of the Apocalypse =

Book by Gerald Horne

- Author: Gerald Horne
- Language: English
- Publisher: Monthly Review Press
- Publication date: 2020
- ISBN: 978-1583678725

The Dawning of the Apocalypse: The Roots of Slavery, White Supremacy, Settler Colonialism, and Capitalism in the Long Sixteenth Century is a book by Gerald Horne, a Professor of African American History at the University of Houston. The book offers a historical analysis of the development of settler colonialism in North America in the 16th century.

== Synopsis ==
Horne argues that the creation myth of settler colonialism and the formation of the United States must be revised by taking into account the period from 1492 until the arrival of English settlers on the northeast coast in 1607; in other words, he refers to the historical context preceding initial European colonization of eastern North America.

Furthermore, Horne says that enslaved Africans were brought to South Carolina by the Spanish Empire in the 1520s, and their rebellion against their captors led to a significant but little-known moment in the history of colonialism. Indigenous peoples and Africans resisted colonialism violently and sometimes succeeded in the short term, especially when they could join or find allies among rival European powers at the borders of one colony or another. The defeat of the Spanish Armada and the English alliance with the Dutch Republic further weakened Spanish dominance and opened an opportunity for England to colonize eastern North America.

During this time, "whiteness" transformed into "white supremacy," allow for white settlers of varying ethnicities and religious affiliations to unite together in British North America in opposition to Native Americans and enslaved Black people. In this manner, Horne argues, race became a factor in dividing people against each other and presented North American colonies as a paragon of republican and religious freedom while attracting European settlers in a context of displacement of indigenous nations and the exploitation of African labor. The profits from these colonial activities would further enable British expansion in Africa and Asia and starting the first multinational capitalist organizations such as the East India Company.

== Reception ==
According to Counterfire's Jamal Elaheebocus, "Horne’s book is an insightful account of how the creation of race and racism by ruling classes allowed for the accompanying rise of capitalism and imperialism and can explain much of the oppression across the capitalist world today. The events of the long sixteenth century are also vital to breaking down liberal ideas of racism as an individual attitude, instead showing how it is very much systematic and has its cause in capitalism."

== See also ==
- The Apocalypse of Settler Colonialism (book)
- White nationalism

== Reviews ==
- Chopra, R. Horne, Gerald. The dawning of the apocalypse: the roots of slavery, white supremacy, settler colonialism, and capitalism in the long sixteenth century. CHOICE: Current Reviews for Academic Libraries, vol. 58, no. 6, Feb. 2021, p. 596.
- McIlvenna, Noeleen. The Dawning of the Apocalypse: The Roots of Slavery, White Supremacy, Settler Colonialism, and Capitalism in the Long Sixteenth Century. North Carolina Historical Review. 2022;99(3):332–333.
- Lyons, David. The Dawning Of The Apocalypse: The Roots Of Slavery, White Supremacy, Settler Colonialism, And Capitalism In The Long Sixteenth Century. Criminal Law and Criminal Justice Book Reviews. 2020-10-05.
- Podcast, Gerald Horne interview at Who belongs? July 2020. Berkley.edu
