= Heloísa Maranhão =

Brazilian writer

- Born: 1925; Rio de Janeiro, Brazil
- Died: 15 December 2014 (aged 88–89)
- Education: University of Brasília
- Occupations: Novelist; playwright; short-story writer
- Writing career
- Period: 1950s–1997
- Genre: Experimental literature
- Notable works: Lucrécia; Florinda; Dona Leonor Teles; Rosa Maria Egipcíaca da Vera Cruz

Heloísa dos Reis Maranhão (1925 – 15 December 2014) was a Brazilian novelist, playwright and short-story writer.

== Life and career ==
Heloísa Maranhão was born in Rio de Janeiro in 1925. She is a descendant of the 16th-century colonial governor Jeronimo de Albuquerque. She received a classical education, at a French-speaking boarding school run by nuns, before graduating in law from the University of Brasília. She worked as a translator and radio producer and teacher of theater. To maintain her freedom, she never married and lived for many years with her sister.

In the 1950s and 1960s, Maranhão wrote experimental theater.

Castelo interior & moradas (1978) contained poems linked intertextually to ancient religious texts. Her first novel, Lucrezia (1979), was set in Renaissance Rome, fusing historical figures in the character of Lucrezia Borgia. Florinda (1982), in which a murder is announced to be committed during a theatrical performance, crossed genre boundaries. In Dona Leonor Teles (1985), a woman with delusions of being 14th-century queen Leonor Teles is hospitalized. A Rainha de Navarra (1986) follows a woman dressed as a queen of Navarre for a samba performance, who believes she is the queen after waking from a faint. Adriana (1990) adopts the perspective of a ten-year-old girl. Her last novel, Rosa Maria Egipcíaca da Vera Cruz (1997), follows a writer sequestered in her bedroom with a 17th-century African slave. The writer is engaged in writing a novel about the slave, Rosa Egipcíaca, which comes to encompass the entire history of Brazil.

Maranhão was a member of the PEN Club of Brazil. She died on 15 December 2014.

== Works ==
- Paixão da terra. 1958.
- Negra Bá: peça de teatro. 1959.
- Castelo interior & moradas. 1978.
- Lucrécia: romance. 1979.
- Florinda : romance policial ... com mistério. 1982.
- Dona Leonor Teles: romance. 1985.
- A rainha de Navarra: romance. 1986.
- Adriana: romance. 1989.
- Rosa Maria Egipcíaca da Vera Cruz: a incrível trajetória de uma princesa negra entre a prostituição e a santidade. 1997.
