= Becoming Mexican American: Ethnicity, Culture, and Identity in Chicano Los Angeles, 1900–1945 =

Book about Mexican American history from 1900–45

- Book cover
- Author: George J. Sánchez
- Language: English
- Subject: Mexican-American history
- Genre: History
- Publisher: Oxford University Press
- Publication date: 1993
- Pages: 400 (hardcover)
- ISBN: 978-0195096484

Becoming Mexican American: Ethnicity, Culture, and Identity in Chicano Los Angeles, 1900–1945, written by George J. Sánchez and published in 1993 by Oxford University Press, explores the experiences of Mexican Americans in Los Angeles during the early 20th century. Sánchez provides a detailed look at Mexican Americans' lives, examining how they navigated living in a new country, including discrimination, poverty, and cultural displacement, and how they created a distinct Mexican American identity.

One of the book's key themes is the concept of "transculturation," which refers to the process of adapting to a new culture while also maintaining elements of one's own culture. Sanchez argues that Mexican-Americans were able to create a unique identity influenced by Mexican and American cultures, which was shaped by the experience of immigration and discrimination.

The book is divided into chapters, organized chronologically, each dealing with a different aspect of the Mexican-American experience. Sánchez draws on a wide range of sources, including oral histories, government documents, and newspapers, to provide a detailed picture of the lives of Mexican Americans during this period.

== Academic journal reviews ==
- Chávez, E. (1998). "Culture, Identity, and Community: Musings on Chicano Historiography at the End of the Millennium". Mexican Studies/Estudios Mexicanos. 14 (1): 213–235. doi:10.2307/1051894. JSTOR 1051894.
- Escobar, E. J. (1995). "Review of Becoming Mexican American: Ethnicity, Culture, and Identity in Chicano Los Angeles, 1900–1945". The Journal of American History. 81 (4): 1772–1773. doi:10.2307/2081782. JSTOR 2081782.
- Ethington, P. J. (1996). "Toward a "Borderlands School" for American Urban Ethnic Studies?". American Quarterly. 48 (2): 344–353. doi:10.1353/aq.1996.0018. JSTOR 30041539. S2CID 142718620.
- García, A. M. (1995). "Review of Becoming Mexican American: Ethnicity, Culture and Identity in Chicano Los Angeles, 1900–1945, by G. J. Sanchez". California History. 74 (3): 340–341. doi:10.2307/25177516. JSTOR 25177516.
- Lipsitz, G. (2013). "How History Happens and Why Culture Counts: Twenty Years after "Becoming Mexican American."". American Quarterly. 65 (2): 405–411. doi:10.1353/aq.2013.0030. JSTOR 43823101. S2CID 144901953.
- Loewen, R. (1999). "The Fragmented Refashioning American Urban Immigration History". Urban History Review / Revue d'histoire Urbaine. 27 (2): 60–63. doi:10.7202/1016583ar. JSTOR 43562212.
- Martínez, O. J. (1995). "Review of Becoming Mexican American: Ethnicity, Culture, and Identity in Chicano Los Angeles, 1900–1945, by G. J. Sánchez". The Western Historical Quarterly. 26 (2): 211–212. doi:10.2307/970191. JSTOR 970191.
- Murguia, E. (1994). "Review of Becoming Mexican American: Ethnicity, Culture and Identity in Chicano Los Angeles, 1900–1945, by G. J. Sanchez". Contemporary Sociology. 23 (5): 649–650. doi:10.2307/2074261. JSTOR 2074261.
- Pitti, S. J. (1994). "Review of Becoming Mexican American: Ethnicity, Culture, and Identity in Chicano Los Angeles, 1900–1945, by G. J. Sànchez". The Historian. 57 (1): 146–147. JSTOR 24449192.
- Romo, R. (1995). "Review of Becoming Mexican American: Ethnicity, Culture and Identity in Chicano Los Angeles, 1900–1945, by G. J. Sánchez". The American Historical Review. 100 (2): 604. doi:10.2307/2169184. JSTOR 2169184.
- San Miguel, G. (1995). "Review of Becoming Mexican American: Ethnicity, Culture, and Identity in Chicano Los Angeles, 1900–1945, by G. J. Sánchez". History of Education Quarterly. 35 (1): 80–81. doi:10.2307/369703. JSTOR 369703.
- Valdés, D. N. (1997). "Review of Becoming Mexican American: Ethnicity, Culture, and Identity in Chicano Los Angeles, 1900–1945; Walls and Mirrors: Mexican Americans, Mexican Immigrants, and the Politics of Ethnicity., by G. J. Sánchez". The Hispanic American Historical Review. 77 (1): 92–93. doi:10.2307/2517070. JSTOR 2517070.
- Vargas, Z. (1996). "Review of Becoming Mexican American: Ethnicity, Culture, and Identity in Chicano Los Angeles, 1900–1945, by G. J. Sánchez". International Labor and Working-Class History. 49: 214–217. doi:10.1017/S0147547900001897. JSTOR 27672297. S2CID 143752175.
- Vigil, J. D. (1997). "Review of Becoming Mexican American: Ethnicity, Culture, and Identity in Chicano Los Angeles, 1900–1945, by G. J. Sánchez". Pacific Historical Review. 66 (2): 281–282. doi:10.2307/3640650. JSTOR 3640650.

== About the author ==
George J. Sánchez is a historian and author; their research focuses on the experiences of Mexican Americans in the United States. He is currently a professor of American Studies and Ethnicity and History at the University of Southern California. In 1989 he received a Ph.D. in history from Stanford University; he previously earned his B.A. in History and Sociology from Harvard University.

== See also ==
- Cannery Women, Cannery Lives: Mexican Women, Unionization, and the California Food Processing Industry, 1930-1950
- Black and Brown: African Americans and the Mexican Revolution, 1910-1920
