= The Apocalypse of Settler Colonialism =

2017 book by Gerald Horne

- Author: Gerald Horne
- Language: English
- Publisher: Monthly Review Press
- Publication date: 2017
- ISBN: 978-1583676639

The Apocalypse of Settler Colonialism: The Roots of Slavery, White Supremacy, and Capitalism in 17th Century North America and the Caribbean is a book by Gerald Horne. It is a historical analysis of the development of settler colonialism in North America and the Caribbean in the 17th century. Sarah Barber from the Lancaster University Department of History reviews the book and concludes "Writing accessible history is never easy, and this is a laudable addition." According to David Waldstreicher, Professor of History at the Graduate Center of the City University of New York, British colonizers committed counter-revolution—revolting against crown and against the threat from below—to increase their control over land and people.

== Synopsis ==
The book argues that the emergence of settler colonialism in this period was driven by the need to solve the crisis of overproduction in Europe, which led to the creation of a new economic system based on slavery, white supremacy, and capitalism. Horne traces the roots of this system to the Wars of the Three Kingdoms and the Cromwellian conquest of Ireland, and shows how the exploitation of Native American and African labor was central to the development of colonial economies.

Horne also examines the role of religion, specifically Puritanism, in the colonization process, arguing that the ideology of white supremacy was rooted in religious beliefs and used to justify the exploitation of non-white labor. He also explores the ways in which resistance to settler colonialism and slavery developed, including the actions of enslaved Africans, Native Americans, and European indentured servants.

Overall, Horne's book analyses the historical roots of settler colonialism and the interconnectedness of capitalism, white supremacy, and slavery in the colonial period. Focusing on the Eastern Seaboard of North America, the Caribbean, Africa, and Great Britain, Horne provides a well-researched, distressing account of the catastrophic loss and suffering.

== See also ==
- The Dawning of the Apocalypse (book)
- Settler colonialism
- White supremacy
- White nationalism
