= Cannery Women, Cannery Lives =

Monograph about Mexican American women in the California food packing industry

Cannery Women, Cannery Lives: Mexican Women, Unionization, and the California Food Processing Industry, 1930-1950
- Book cover
- Author: Vicki L. Ruiz
- Language: English
- Subject: California History
- Genre: Non-fiction, History
- Publisher: University of New Mexico Press
- Publication date: 1987
- Publication place: United States
- Media type: Hardcover, Paperback, eBook
- Pages: 194
- ISBN: 978-0826309884

Cannery Women, Cannery Lives: Mexican Women, Unionization, and the California Food Processing Industry, 1930-1950 is a 1987 monograph by Vicki L. Ruiz published by the University of New Mexico Press.

== Synopsis ==
Cannery Women, Cannery Lives tells the history of Mexican and Mexican-American women working in the California canning and food processing industry and their involvement in labor organization and unionization during 1930–1950. Ruiz combines a variety of sources, government records, newspaper articles, union documents, and oral histories to tell the story of how Mexican American women shaped the canning and food processing industry and unionization in California and how the industry in turn impacted their lives, families and communities.

The book is divided into six chapters. The first two chapters discuss the details of the work, family, and community lives of the women working in the industry; the role of family and kinship connections form an important theme in the work. Chapters 3–5 focus on the United Cannery, Agricultural, Packing, and Allied Workers of America (UCAPAWA), a loosely organized labor union created in 1937, and how it developed and influenced the California food packing industry and the roles Mexican women in the cannery industry played in its organization, development, and leadership. The final chapter discusses the competition between the UCAPAWA and the more centrally organized Teamsters and its eventual decline and absorption into the Distributive and Processing Workers of America.

== Academic journal reviews ==
- Acuña, Rodolfo F. (1989). "The Struggles of Class and Gender: Current Research in Chicano Studies". Journal of American Ethnic History. 8 (2). Sarah Deutsch, Susan Keefe, Amado Padilla, Vicki L. Ruiz, Patricia Zavella (eds.): 134–138. JSTOR 27500685.
- Baldwin, Deborah (1989). "Review of Cannery Women, Cannery Lives: Mexican Women, Unionization, and the California Food Processing Industry, 1930-1950". Journal of the Southwest. 31 (4): 591–592. JSTOR 40169635.
- Blackwelder, Julia Kirk (1989). "Review of Cannery Women, Cannery Lives: Mexican Women, Unionization, and the California Food Processing Industry, 1930-1950". The American Historical Review. 94 (2): 540. doi:10.2307/1867003. JSTOR 1867003.
- del Castillo, Richard Griswold (1989). "Review of Cannery Women, Cannery Lives: Mexican Women, Unionization, and the California Food Processing Industry, 1930-1950". Southern California Quarterly. 71 (4): 352–353. doi:10.2307/41171458. JSTOR 41171458.
- Garcia, Mario T. (1990). "Review of Cannery Women/Cannery Lives: Mexican Women, Unionization, and the California Food Processing Industry, 1930-1950; Women's Work and Chicano Families: Cannery Workers of the Santa Clara Valley". International Labor and Working-Class History (37): 124–128. doi:10.1017/S0147547900010115. JSTOR 27671881.
- Helmbold, Lois Rita (1988). "Organizing Cannery Row". The Women's Review of Books. 5 (8): 14–15. doi:10.2307/4020217. JSTOR 4020217.
- Petrik, Paula (1988). "Review of Cannery Women, Cannery Lives: Mexican Women, Unionization, and the California Food Processing Industry, 1930-1950". The Western Historical Quarterly. 19 (4): 460–461. doi:10.2307/968335. JSTOR 968335.
- Philips, Peter (1988). "Review of Cannery Women, Cannery Lives: Mexican Women, Unionization, and the California Food Processing Industry, 1930-1950". The Business History Review. 62 (3): 534–536. doi:10.2307/3115556. JSTOR 3115556. S2CID 154071657.
- Philips, Peter (1989). "Review of Cannery Women, Cannery Lives: Mexican Women, Unionization, and the California Food Processing Industry, 1930-1950". The Journal of Economic History. 49 (1): 244–245. doi:10.1017/S0022050700007750. JSTOR 2121459. S2CID 96468467.
- Romero, Yolanda G. (1989). "Review of Cannery Women, Cannery Lives: Mexican Women, Unionization, and the California Food Processing Industry, 1930-1950". The Southwestern Historical Quarterly. 92 (4): 626–627. JSTOR 30241243.
- Shopes, Linda; Zavella, Patricia (1988). "Review of Women's Work and Chicano Families: Cannery Workers of the Santa Clara Valley; Cannery Women, Cannery Lives: Mexican Women, Unionization, and the California Food Processing Industry, 1930-1950". Technology and Culture. 29 (4): 925–927. doi:10.2307/3105060. JSTOR 3105060.
- Weiner, Lynn; Zavella, Patricia (1988). "Review of Cannery Women, Cannery Lives: Mexican Women, Unionization, and the California Food Processing Industry, 1930-1950; Women's Work and Chicano Families: Cannery Workers of the Santa Clara Valley". The Journal of American History. 75 (3): 1002–1004. doi:10.2307/1901692. JSTOR 1901692.
- Zavella, Patricia; Matthews, Glenna (1989). "Review of Cannery Women-Cannery Lives: Mexican Women, Unionization, and the California Food Processing Industry, 1930-1950; Women's Work and Chicano Families: Cannery Workers of the Santa Clara Valley". Pacific Historical Review. 58 (2): 253–254. doi:10.2307/3639862. JSTOR 3639862.

== Release information ==
- Hardcover: 1987 (First Edition), University of New Mexico Press, pp.194 ISBN 978-0826310064.
- Paperback: 1987, University of New Mexico Press, pp.212 ISBN 978-0826309884.

== About the author ==
Vicki L. Ruiz is a historian and professor focusing on the lives of Mexican American women in the 20th century. Ruiz has served as president of the American Historical Association, the American Studies Association, the Berkshire Conference of Women Historians, and the Organization of American Historians. In 2015 she was inducted into the American Academy of Arts and Sciences and was awarded the National Humanities Medal.

== See also ==
- Becoming Mexican American: Ethnicity, Culture, and Identity in Chicano Los Angeles, 1900-1945
