= List of archives in Brazil =

This is list of archives in Brazil.

== Archives in Brazil ==
- Brazilian National Archives
- Arquivo Edgard Leuenroth
- Brazilian Studies Institute (University of São Paulo)
- Arquivo Público do Estado da Bahia
- Arquivo Público Municipal de Caetité
- Arquivo Público Municipal de Camaçari
- Arquivo Público do Estado do Ceará
- Arquivo Público do Distrito Federal
- Arquivo Histórico Estadual de Goiás
- Arquivo Público Mineiro
- Arquivo Público do Estado da Paraíba
- Arquivo Público de Pernambuco
- Arquivo Público do Estado do Piauí
- Arquivo Público do Estado de São Paulo
- Arquivo Histórico de Joinville
- Arquivo Público do Estado de Santa Catarina
- Arquivo Público e Histórico Amadio Vettoretti
- Arquivo Geral da Cidade do Rio de Janeiro
- Arquivo Histórico do Exército
- Arquivo Histórico Municipal de Resende
- Arquivo Municipal de Piraí
- Arquivo Público do Estado do Rio de Janeiro
- Arquivo Histórico do Rio Grande do Sul
- Arquivo Público do Estado do Rio Grande do Sul
- Arquivo Histórico Municipal João Spadari Adami
- Arquivo Histórico de Porto Alegre Moysés Vellinho
- Arquivo da Arquidiocese de São Paulo
- Arquivo Histórico Municipal Capitão Hipólito Antônio Pinheiro
- Arquivo Histórico Municipal Washington Luís

== See also ==
- List of archives
- List of museums in Brazil
- Culture of Brazil
- History of Brazil
