= Arquivo Público do Estado de São Paulo =

Public Archives of the State of São Paulo
- Arquivo Público do Estado de São Paulo
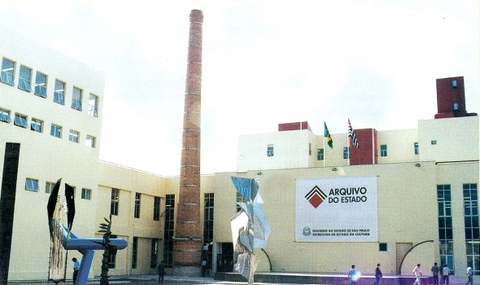
- Sao Paulo, Brazil
- 23°30′54.777″S 46°37′35.3064″W
- Location: Rua Voluntários da Pátria, 596, Santana, São Paulo, Brazil
- Established: 1891

Other information
- Website: www.arquivoestado.sp.gov.br

Arquivo Público do Estado de São Paulo (English: Public Archives of the State of São Paulo) is the archival institution of the Executive Branch of the State of São Paulo responsible for formulating and implementing the state's archives policy, through the management of documents produced by the executive branch of São Paulo, the preservation of documents categorized as "permanent storage" (also called "historical"), the dissemination of documentary heritage and access to the information contained in such documents. The APESP is located in a group of buildings in the Santana neighborhood of São Paulo, near the Tietê Bus Station. It is one of the largest public archives in Brazil, comprising an abundant collection for research and helping to rescue the public memory of São Paulo.

Created in 1891, the Public Archives is one of the oldest departments in the state of São Paulo. Its collection is composed of documents from both the State Secretariats and the Judiciary, city halls, notary offices and private funds, including manuscripts from Colonial Brazil, important records belonging to the now defunct DOPS and private collections of former governors and presidents, such as Júlio Prestes, Washington Luis and Adhemar de Barros.

Currently linked to the Secretariat of Management and Digital Government, APESP is the central body of the São Paulo State Archives System (SAESP), being responsible for the coordination and systematization of São Paulo's public archives, involving the creation of Temporality Tables, assembly and coordination of Evaluation Committees, and the effective disposal or collection of documentary sets produced by the São Paulo government.

It is one of the largest public archives in Brazil, containing a rich collection available for public research, with more than 25 million textual documents and 3 million iconographic and cartographic documents, available for research. Its collection consists of documents from agencies and entities of the São Paulo Public Administration, as well as private documents of individuals or legal entities declared to be of public and social interest. It has handwritten documents from Colonial Brazil, records belonging to the extinct DOPS, private archives of former governors such as Mário Covas, Júlio Prestes, Washington Luis and Adhemar de Barros, as well as digital documents from the 21st century.

The State Public Archive also holds the collections of defunct agencies and entities and, recently, incorporated the documents of the Companhia Paulista de Obra e Serviços (CPOS), Desenvolvimento Rodoviário S/A (DERSA), Empresa Paulista de Planejamento Metropolitano S.A. (EMPLASA), Fundação do Desenvolvimento Administrativo (FUNDAP), Fundação Prefeito Faria Lima - Centro de Estudos e Pesquisas de Administração Municipal (CEPAM) etc. In addition to consulting the collection, the State Public Archive offers, among others, the services of certificates and certified copies; reproduction of documents; monitored visits; educational action and publishing of technical manuals and the Archive Magazine.

== History ==
=== The institution ===
The State Public Archives are one of the oldest public offices in São Paulo. Their origins date back to 1721, on the initiative of Captain-Major Dom Rodrigues César de Meneses. As Governor of the then Captaincy of São Paulo, César de Meneses had instructed his government secretary, Gervásio Leite Rabelo, to begin the “Inventory of Government Documents”. Stored in the Pátio do Colégio, the seat of government at the time, the documents collected by Rabelo constituted the initial nucleus of the institution’s current collection.

In 1892, decree number 30, instituted by the vice-governor of the state, José Alves de Cerqueira César, created the “Statistics and Archives Department of the State”, subordinate to the Secretariat of the Interior, and whose objective was “the safekeeping, coordination and classification of all papers, documents and books pertaining to Constitutional Law, Political and Administrative History, Legislation and Geography of São Paulo, and all others that the competent authorities determine to be deposited there”. Thus, the “State Archives” began to store not only the official letters and materials of the government departments, but also documents originating from municipalities, the judiciary, notary offices and private individuals.

In 1899, Colonel Fernando Prestes de Albuquerque, then president of the State of São Paulo, instituted Law No. 666, of September 6, which ordered "the removal to the public archive of the State of all papers, records and books existing in the offices of judicial clerks, registry officers and notaries, prior to the 19th century." In this way, a large volume of documentation from the colonial and imperial period was transferred to the custody of the State Public Archive.

In 2012, a new building for the institution was inaugurated, this was the first building to support large archives in Brazil. In addition, in that same year, a law was enacted in São Paulo that regulates access to information in the state, giving the Public Archives authority to coordinate the systemic integrations of the Citizen Information Services (SIC).

=== Headquarters ===
From the year it was created until 1906, the archive initially occupied the ground floor and, later, part of the Pátio do Colégio convent. It was then transferred to the back of the Nossa Senhora dos Remédios church building, located at Rua Onze de Agosto, number 80, in the central region of São Paulo, and was demolished in the 1940s. It also occupied a building on Rua Visconde do Rio Branco, on the corner of Rua dos Timbiras, where it operated until 1949. In that year, the archive was closed, only resuming its activities at the end of the following year, that is, on November 26, 1949, it suffered a tremendous blow: it was suddenly forced to move from the building that had been expropriated. This led to a complete disorganization of the collection, which provoked severe criticism of the government by the newspapers. This meant that the collection was left only for administrative activities, since the collection was separated and stored in three different locations.

In 1951, the archive was installed in the E. F. Sorocabana building, in Largo General Osório (where the Department of Political and Social Order operated). In 1953, the archive was installed at Rua Dona Antônia de Queiroz nº 183 (former building of the “Manufactura de Tapetes Santa Helena”), where the building had 165 windows and good natural lighting, "facilitating much less visual fatigue for readers of old documentation", where it remained until 1997.

On April 22, 1997, the State Archives moved to a set of buildings in the Santana neighborhood, home to the former "Ita Carpet Factory". Renovated to meet the institution's needs, the buildings now contain storage facilities for the collection, as well as laboratories, consultation rooms and an amphitheater. Part of its collection, called the Administrative Archives, is kept in an old industrial warehouse in Mooca (a neighborhood in São Paulo), with restricted access).

And in 2012, a new building was opened for the complex. This is the first Brazilian building designed specifically to be a modern Archive, in accordance with the technical specifications required to ensure the safekeeping and preservation of permanent documents. It has twenty-three thousand square meters of built area, distributed over ten floors, five of which have double-height ceilings to house documents for permanent storage; laboratories for preventive conservation, restoration, microfilming, digitalization and storage.

== Collection ==
Officially created in 1892, the Public Archives of the State of São Paulo are one of the main sources for documentary research in Brazil and an important reference in Brazilian historiography. It is one of the largest public archives in Brazil, containing a rich collection available for public research, with more than 25 million textual documents and 3 million iconographic and cartographic documents, available for research. The institution houses approximately 26 thousand linear meters of textual documentation, in addition to an iconographic collection with about one and a half million images (photographs, negatives, postcards, cartoons and illustrations) and several thousand rolls of microfilm. It also houses a library to support research, with 45 thousand volumes, in addition to the map library and a large newspaper library. The collection is divided into “public funds” (produced by the bodies of the São Paulo Executive Branch, foundations and public universities), “private funds” (private documents of individuals or legal entities declared to be of public and social interest, donated or purchased by the state), “notary funds” (civil and real estate records).

From the colonial period, the archive houses around seven million loose manuscripts and another thousand handwritten books, ranging from inventories and wills to “wanted” posters for forged slaves. The oldest item is the so-called “Shoemaker’s Inventory,” a record of Damião Simões’ assets, dated 1578. The section called Private Archives holds private documents, such as the collection of former president Washington Luís, donated to the archive in his will.

== Education ==
The educational action of the Public Archives of the State of São Paulo is responsible for developing some educational programs that aim to bring APESP closer to educational institutions and society in general. Some of the activities carried out by the group are pedagogical workshops aimed at teachers and students of all levels of education and virtual exhibitions. The pedagogical process is carried out with teachers from the public and private networks, with the purpose of bringing those involved closer to historical articles of the city of São Paulo.

== SP Sem Papel ==
As part of the SP Sem Papel Program, the Public Archives of the State of São Paulo and the Data Processing Company of the State of São Paulo (PRODESP) conducted tests, performed requirements analysis, mapped and modeled documents, and developed rules for parameterization and technological improvement of the SIGAdoc system. The idea of the Program is to transition the State Administration to the digital production of documents, instead of producing and processing them on paper.

== ArquivoDigital.SP ==
Considering the progressive and secure inclusion of public administration in digital practices, the State Public Archives created the ArquivoDigital.SP Program, composed of several actions that aim to adopt digital preservation and security policies, techniques and procedures capable of controlling the risks arising from the degradation of support, technological obsolescence, as well as guaranteeing the integrity, authenticity and availability of government documents, data and information. In this sense, a pilot of a reliable digital archival repository (RDC-Arq) capable of guaranteeing the preservation of long-term intermediate storage and permanent storage documents is under construction.

== See also ==
- Municipal Historical Archives of São Paulo
- Public Archive for the State of Rio de Janeiro
- Brazilian National Archives
- List of archives in Brazil
