= Arquivo Edgard Leuenroth =

- Interactive map of Arquivo Edgard Leuenroth
- 22°48′48″S 47°03′59″W
- Location: Rua Cláudio Abramo, 377 - Campinas
- Affiliation: University of Campinas
- Website: Official website

Arquivo Edgard Leuenroth is a historical and media archive that is maintained by the Brazilian State University of Campinas (Universidade Estadual de Campinas—Unicamp), located in the city of Campinas in the state of São Paulo, Brazil. It was started by a donation of the media collection assembled by Brazilian anarchist journalist and publisher Edgard Leuenroth (1881–1968).

For several months, it was housed in the university’s administration building before being transferred to the IFCH library, until it was finally established in a suitable, dedicated space with the opening of a new headquarters in 2009. Belonging to the Institute of Philosophy and Human Sciences at this university, it has been fulfilling its mission of meeting academic needs and preserving historical records of society since 1974.

The Arquivo Edgard Leuenroth has the largest collection of materials regarding social movements, counterculture, and other alternative cultural movements in Brazil. This collection is, therefore, very much appreciated by researchers from all over the world, because it presents a non-official view and understanding of Brazil in the twentieth century. Among others, the Feminist Movement (or Movimento Feminista) and the Homosexual Movement (or Movimento Homossexual, in this case, the Gay Group of Bahia), are among the many collections being maintained by the Arquivo Edgard Leuenroth of the State University of Campinas.

The collection includes 280,000 documents, 28,000 books, 854 videos, 289 films, 1,419 audio recordings and 45,000 photographs.

== See also ==
- List of archives in Brazil
