= Brazilian National Archives =

National archives

National Archives

- Interactive map of National Archives
- 22.9065°S 43.1908°W
- Alternative name: Arquivos Nacionais (Portuguese)
- Location: Praça da República, 173, Rio de Janeiro, Brazil
- Type: National archives
- Established: 2 January 1838; 188 years ago
- Affiliation: Ministry of Justice and Public Security
- Director: Mônica Lima e Souza
- Collection size: Physical: 50.8 km (31.6 mi); Digital: 1.83 TB

Building information
- Construction date: 1860
- Website: www.gov.br/arquivonacional/

The National Archives of Brazil (Portuguese: Arquivo Nacional, AN) were created in 1838 as the Imperial Public Archives. The Archives were renamed in 1911, and are located in Rio de Janeiro. The National Archives of Brazil is the Brazilian institution responsible for the management, preservation and dissemination of federal government documents. Since 2011, it is subordinated to the Ministry of Justice and Public Security.

The AN has the following responsibilities, according to the Decree No. 9,360 of May 7, 2018, which grants it as the main body of Archival Documents Management System (in Portuguese: Sistema de Gestão de Documentos de Arquivo – SIGA) of the federal government: "to guide the main organizations and entities of the federal Executive Power in the implementation of document management programs; oversee the application of procedures and technical operations related to the production, registration, classification, control of the processing, use and evaluation of documents, to modernize government archival services; promote the collection of permanent guard documents for technical treatment, preservation and dissemination, to guarantee full access to information, in support of governmental decisions of a political–administrative nature and to the citizen in the defense of their rights, aiming to encourage the production of scientific and cultural knowledge; and supervise and apply the national policy archives, established by the National Council of Archives (Conselho Nacional de Arquivo – CONARQ)".

The National Archives of Brazil therefore fulfills a dual function for the State and the Public – both in the management of archival documents that are produced in all Federal institutions and in safeguarding and giving access to fundamental funds for historical research.

== Mission ==
The National Archives of Brazil (AN) fulfills part of its institutional mission by offering guidance, technical assistance and training to the servants of other federal public administration bodies throughout Brazil in the area of management, preservation, technical processing, access and dissemination of documents under the Archival Documents Management System (in Portuguese: Sistema de Gestão de Documentos de Arquivo – SIGA). Through its conservation area, the National Archives of Brazil guarantees the protection of the fundamental documentary heritage for the country. These actions are complemented by the technical treatment of its fonds, to make it available to the public through search systems and research instruments.

Thus, the National Archives offers thousands of documents in its custody accessible anywhere in the world through the Internet; On the other hand, it is possible to consult the documents in person at your two units (in Rio de Janeiro and Brasilia) or the distance or by email. The National Archives currently has 10 electronic sites, 7 databases and 42 research tools that allow its users access to information on the document, as well as information about its activities and events. The Information System of the National Archives – SIAN is its main system. The access to information and documents of the National Archives of Brazil is enhanced by various dissemination actions, such as electronic research sites, exhibitions and publications. Among them, the Arquivo em Cartaz – International Archives Film Festival, Revista Acervo, National Archives Week; Memórias Reveladas; besides having a great presence in social medias, joining in 2017 the GLAM project of the Wikicommons. The Archives also holds pre-1959 diplomatic records between Brazil and the United States of America. It may be necessary to contact Brazil's Ministry of Foreign Affairs to access some of the records.

== History ==
=== The Public Archives of the Brazilian Empire ===
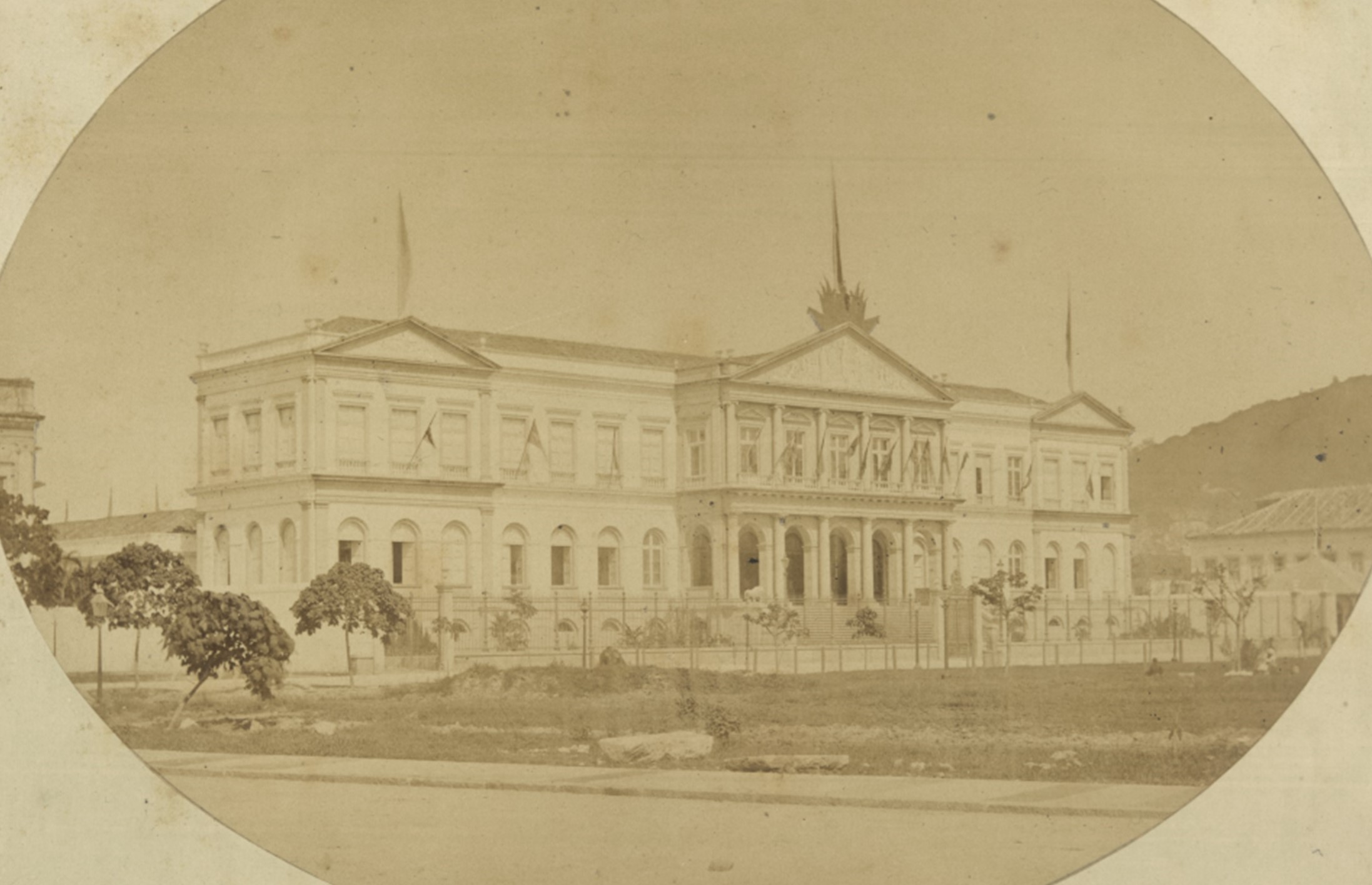
Building of the Public Archives of the Empire, in 1866

The regulation No. 2, of January 2, 1838, created the Public Archives of the Brazilian Empire, as provided for in the Constitution of 1824, provisionally established in the Secretariat of State for the Business of the Empire. The creation of the National Archives, together with the Brazilian Historic and Geographic Institute, which added to the Imperial Academy of the Arts, joined the regency effort of Pedro de Araújo Lima, future Viscount and Marqués de Olinda, for the construction of an imperial State.

The Public Archives of the Empire was intended to safeguard public documents and was organized into three sections: Administrative, responsible for the documents of the Executive and Moderator powers; Legislative, in charge of the custody of the documents produced by the Legislative Power and the Historical Section, responsible for the most important documents for the history of Brazil. Its first headquarters was located in the building of the Ministry of the Empire, in the street of the Guarda Velha Street, current Treze de Maio Avenue. In 1844, the Public Archives of the Empire came to stay in Praça do Comércio, on Direita Street, today Primeiro de Março Avenue, Rio de Janeiro.

Initially the organ functioned as a distribution attached to the Secretariat of State for the Business of the Empire, becoming autonomous in 1840. However, it occupied the secretarial building until 1854, when it was transferred to the upper floor of the Convent of Santo Antônio. In 1860, decree n. 2,541 reformed the institution, maintaining the same division of the sections, however, detailing a little more the attributions of each one.

From the decade of 1870, a greater structuring of the organ is observed. In the year 1870, the archive came to occupy the old building of the Recolhimento do Parto dos Terceiros da Ordem do Carmo. In 1873, Joaquim Pires Machado Portella became director of the institution, and in the following year the archive was opened for public consultation. A new regulation was adopted, approved by Decree n. 6.164, of March 24, 1876, determining various transformations and establishing more detailed work procedures. With the Republic, in 1911, the organ had its name altered for National Public Archives, like many other institutions that possessed the term "Imperial" in their names.

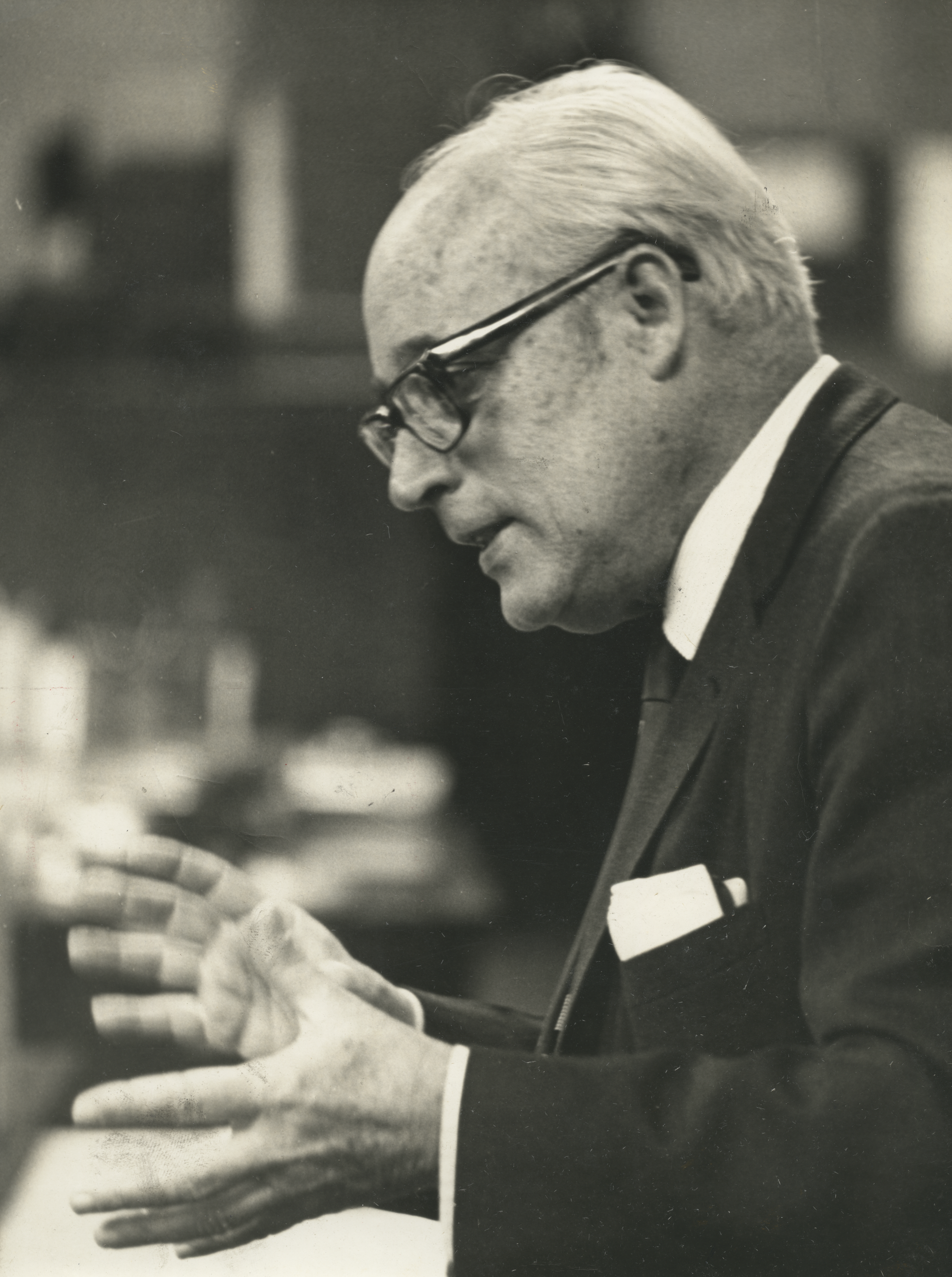
José Honório Rodrigues, director (1958–1964)

=== The Reformation of José Honório Rodrigues ===
For José Honório Rodrigues, director from 1958 to 1964, the National Archives "was stagnant, impervious to initiative, as a model of archaic institution, a ghost of other times". In order to change that situation, as director of the National Archives, José Honório Rodrigues himself achieved the approval of a new Regulation by Decree No. 44,862, of November 21, 1958, which defines the Archive as a national distribution, establishes the archives policy, its attributions and objectives, defends and extends the collection selected throughout the national territory and in all sources of federal documentation; it extends to the defense by the preservation of documents in films, discs, photographs; it creates research and historical information services, relating them to equal services in the Armed Forces and in other public and private institutions". Thus, "with this proposal of a centralizing body for the regulation of archival procedures, it is reaffirmed the idea of Archives as a space of Power". During José Honório Rodrigues' period, one can also observe the development of various courses related to the training of professionals able to work in archives. Such courses, in 1977, gave rise to the first course of graduation in Archival science, at the Federal University of the State of Rio de Janeiro.

=== The institutional modernization of the 1980s ===
With the approval in 1975 of a new regulation an important step was taken, when the idea of document management was incorporated, through the Pre-Archive Division, which was installed itself in Brasilia the following year, demonstrating the Archives concern with its actions before the public administration in the capital. The preservation of documents of the public power as a purpose of the National Archives System (SINAR) was one of the conquests of the late 1970s. With the National Archives as the central organ, the system was composed of the bodies of the direct and indirect federal administration that had intermediate and permanent archiving activities.

Following the suggestion of UNESCO, at the request of the general director of the National Archives, Celina Vargas do Amaral Peixoto, of a "pilot project of modernization of traditional type within an archives institution" and to guarantee a radical change, it was necessary to translation to a new headquarters; the identification of all the documents kept in the National Archives; the census of the fonds not collected and the training of the workers of the institution. These were the conditions required for the preparation of federal legislation and a new structure for the National Archives. The result of an agreement between the Ministry of Justice and the Getúlio Vargas Foundation (FGV), the Administrative Institutional Modernization Project of the National Archive was signed in 1981, as the subsequent passage of the Archives to the autonomous body of the direct administration in the structure of the Ministry and the transfer to the building attached to the old Casa da Moeda, in January 1985, the interest of international organizations in that decade was awakened.

Thus, on January 3, 1985, the National Archives os Brazil moved to its current headquarters, which occupies one of the buildings of the old Casa da Moeda (1868–1983), one of the most beautiful buildings built in the nineteenth century style in the Praça da República. After an award-winning restoration process, in 2004, it occupies the historical part of that architectural ensemble. In Brasilia, while it does not havea specific building, the AN uses since 1988 part of the facilities of the National Press (Imprensa Nacional), having 18 thousand meters of shelves for guard of documents in its regional coordination – at the moment, the only one outside Rio de Janeiro.

==== Damage of old documents ====
On February 7, 2023, heavy rains that fell in the city of Rio de Janeiro caused water to infiltrate the National Archive building. According to its directors, no damage occurred and all the material supposedly had been recovered. However, according to its employees, the rain, combined with the condition of the building, caused the destruction of documents dating back more than 400 years, related to the Portuguese royal family.

=== List of directors of the National Archives of Brazil ===
Raul Lima, Directors of the National Archives of Brazil (1969–1980)

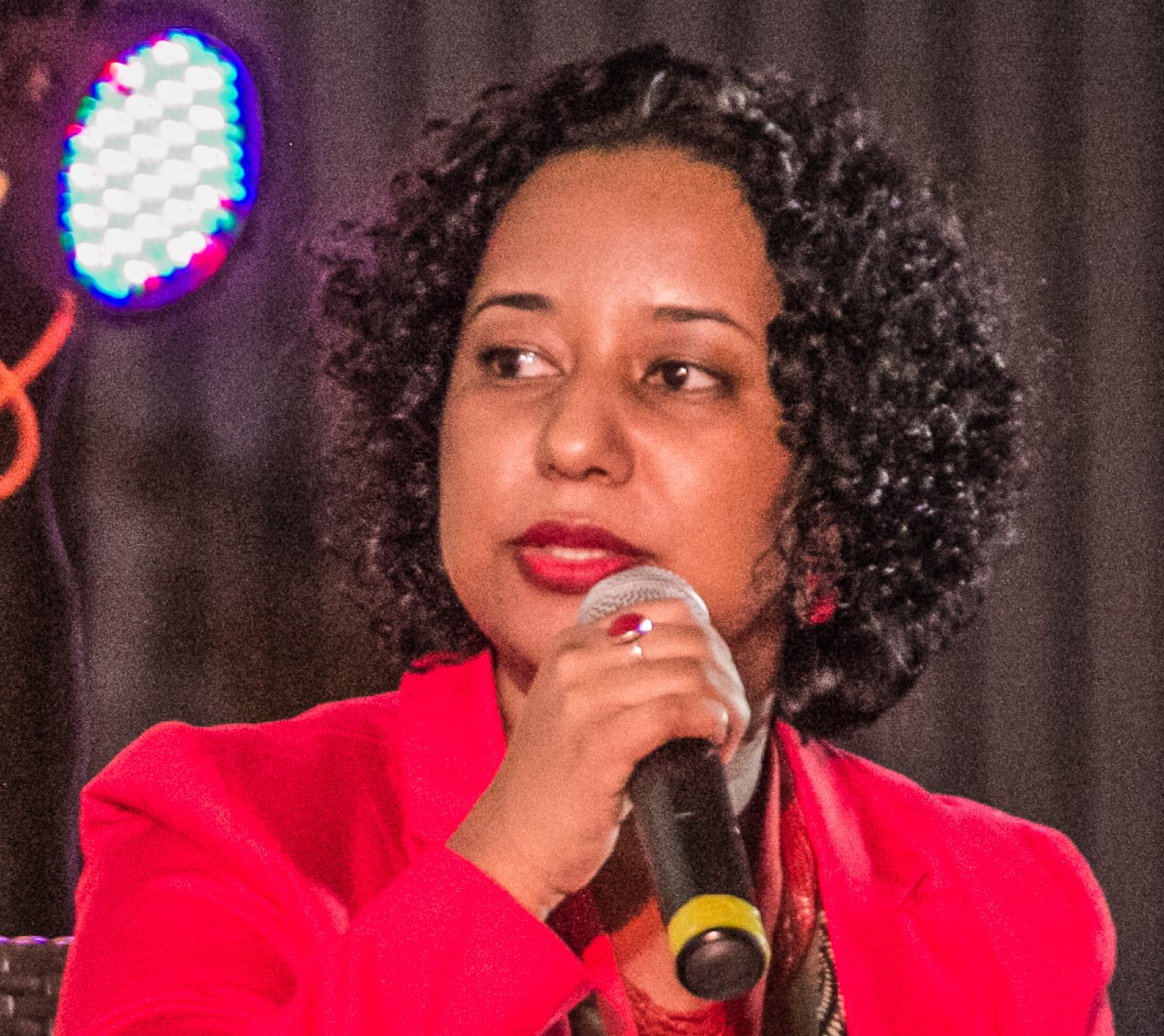
Ana Flávia Magalhães Pinto, Directors of the National Archives of Brazil since 2023

- (1840–1857) – Ciro Cândido Martins de Brito
- (1857–1860) – José Tomás de Oliveira Barbosa (interim)
- (1860–1869) – Antônio Pereira Pinto
- (1869–1873) – Joaquim Caetano
- (1873–1898) – Joaquim Pires Machado Portela
- (1899–1902) – Pedro Veloso Rebelo
- (1902–1910) – Francisco Joaquim Béthencourt da Silva
- (1910–1915) – Alcebíades Estêvão Furtado
- (1915–1917) – Frederico Schumann
- (1917–1922) – Luís Gastão d'Escragnolle Dória
- (1922–1938) – João Alcides Bezerra Cavalcanti
- (1938–1958) – Eugênio Vilhena de Morais
- (1958–1964) – José Honório Rodrigues
- (1964–1969) – Pedro Paulo Moniz Barreto de Aragão
- (1969–1980) – Raul do Rego Lima
- (1980–1990) – Celina Vargas do Amaral Peixoto
- (1990–1991) – Tereza Maria Sussekind Rocha (interim)
- (1991–1992) – Maria Alice Barroso
- (1992–2016) – Jaime Antunes da Silva
- (2016–2016) – Maria Izabel de Oliveira (interim)
- (2016–2016) – José Ricardo Marques
- (2016–2016) – Ivan Fernandes Neves (interim)
- (2016–2017) – José Ricardo Marques
- (2017–2017) – Diego Barbosa da Silva (interim)
- (2017–2019) – Carolina Chaves de Azevedo
- (2019–2021) – Neide de Sordi
- (2021–2022) – Ricardo Borda D'Água de Almeida Braga
- (2023–2023) – Leandro Esteves de Freitas (interino)
- (2023– ) – Ana Flávia Magalhães Pinto

== Collections ==
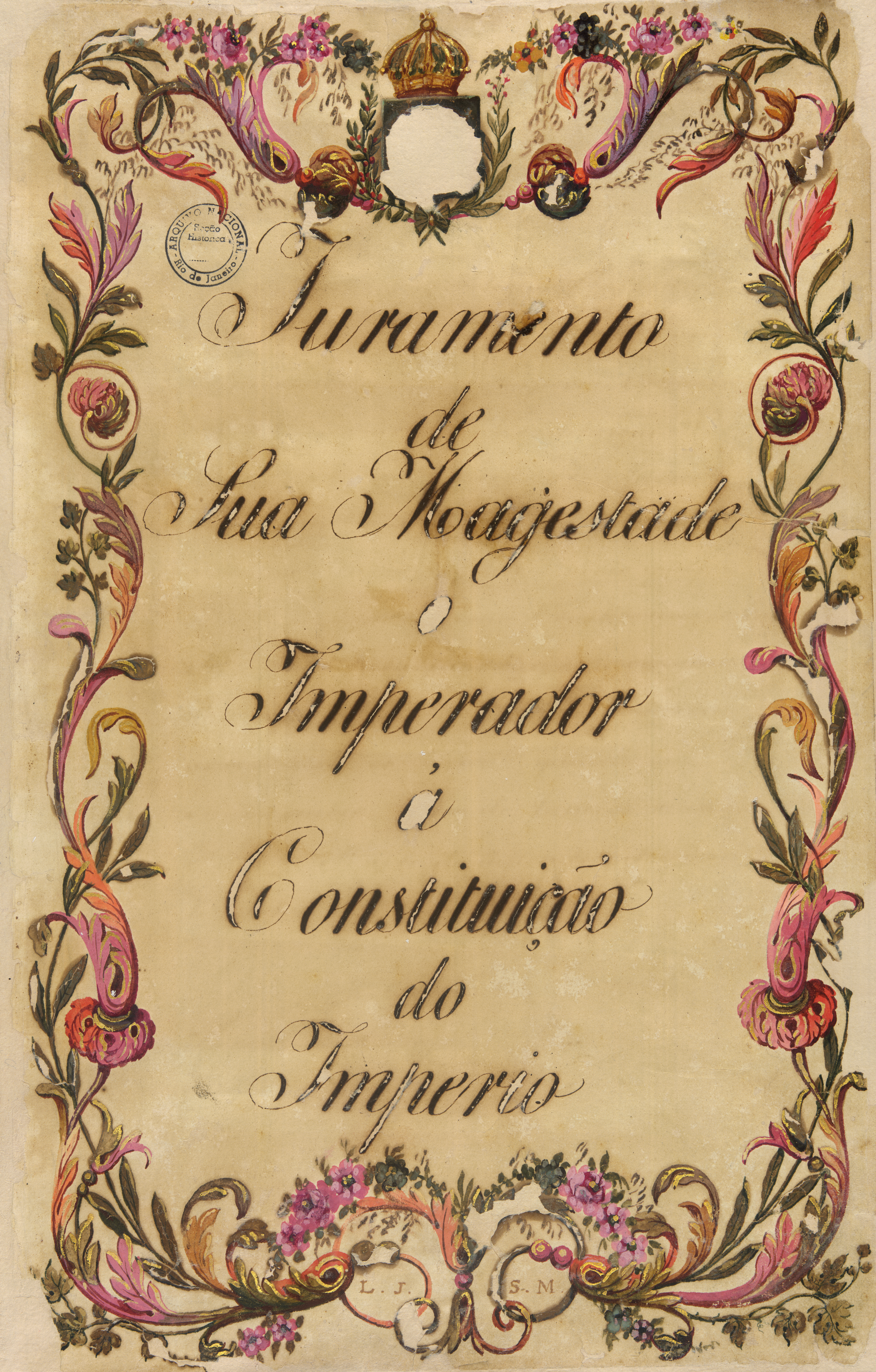
Oath of His Majesty the Emperor Peter I to the Constitution of the Empire (1824)

In its two units in Rio de Janeiro and Brasilia, the National Archives of Brazil safeguards about 55 km of text documents; 1.74 million photographs and negatives, 200 photo albums, 4 thousand cartoons and drawings, 3 thousand posters, a thousand postcards, 300 drawings and 20 thousand illustrations, as well as maps, films and sound recordings.

The textual documentation from the federal Executive, Judicial and Legislative and the former Moderating powers also includes private collections. Correspondence and legislation originated around the Portuguese ultramarine empire, the archives brought with the court of João VI in 1808, among others, describe the beginning of Brazilian society. With the rupture of the colonial past, the formation of the imperial state can be known through the documents generated by the ministries and the judiciary, such as the Casa da Suplicação, the General Audit of Marinha, in addition to the original Constitution of 1824 and the Golden Law.

Among the documents produced by the republican regime, stand out the entry records of immigrants, patents of inventions, books of civil registry, civic and criminal proceedings, sightings of UFOs, urbanization and sanitation projects related to the first years of the 20th century. The constitutions from the year 1891, the processes of the National Security Court, the Supreme Military Court and the Supreme Federal Court, the censorship bodies, the documents of entities such as the National Information Service, which compose the repressive apparatus to the Political struggles of the Military Dictatorship and several other governmental institutions reflect the formation of contemporary Brazil and relevant aspects of the country's recent history. In addition to the documents of the information and counter-information body of the military regime, personal archives and private entities are important, including Eusébio de Queirós, the Duke of Caxias, Bertha Lutz, Luis Carlos Prestes, Salgado Filho, San Tiago Dantas, Goes Monteiro, Apolônio de Carvalho, Mário Lago, Zelia Pedreira Abreu Magalhães, Maria Beatriz Nascimento, the presidents of Republic Floriano Peixoto, Prudente de Morais, Afonso Pena, João Goulart, the Brazilian Academy of Letters, the Brazilian Federation for Female Progress, the Institute of Pesquisa e Estudos Sociais (IPES) and the Association of Brazilian Archivists.

Composed of maps and architectural plans, the cartographic documentation has more than 44,000 titles on the geography of different regions of the world and Brazil from the 17th to the 20th century. In reference to Brazil, the planning and urban infrastructure projects stand out, such as the buildings of the Central Avenue, current Rio Branco Avenue, in Rio de Janeiro, as well as railroads, telegraphs, ports, rivers and canalization of the systems of water supply.

The iconographic documentation has its starting point in the 1860s, coinciding with the expansion of photography. Of the universe of images produced by important national and foreign photographers who worked in Brazil and abroad, the archives of the National Agency (1930–1979), the newspaper Correio da Manhã (1901–1974) and the Ferrez family stand out (1839–2000), as well as private records of the Collection of Single Photographs.

The collection of sound documents covers the period from 1902 to the year 1990 and consists of more than 11 thousand articles, including records and audio tapes of National Agency fond, Presidency of the Republic, Radio Mayrink Veiga, Humberto Franceschi, Radio Jornal do Brasil, Casa Edison and Public Amusement Censorship Service, as well as collections of classical and popular music.

The set of moving images contains records of Brazilian history and culture spanning 33,000 titles: a total of 124,000 reels of film and 4,000 magnetic video tapes. They are part of the collection of newsreels, documentaries, fiction films and advertising, family and film clippings that have been censored, derived from the National Agency, the Division of Public Diversity Censorship, TV Tupi and the National Energy Commission Nuclear, among other fonds and collections.

=== Documents nominated by UNESCO as Memory of the World ===
The National Archives, in addition to supporting the functioning of the National Committee of Brazil, under the Ministry of Culture, has nominated some documents in the Memory of the World Program, of UNESCO.

Golden Law, 1888

==== National Registry (Brazil) ====
- Autos da Devassa – The Minas Gerais Conspiracy, Levante de Tiradentes – 2007
- Golden Law – 2008
- Vapor relations with list of immigrants. Santos Maritime, Air and Border Policy Service (SPMAF / SP-Santos) – 2009
- National Agency: information at the service of the State, in conjunction with the Cinemateca Brasileira Foundation – 2010
- Fond Francisco Bhering – The Letter of Brazil to the millionth (1777–1937) – 2011
- Original Correspondence of the Governors of Pará with the Portuguese Court. Letters and Annexes (1764–1807) – 2017
- The Brazilian Federation for Women's Progress Fond as part of the legacy of Bertha Lutz (1881–1985) in conjunction with the Historical Archive of Itamaraty, the Documentation and Information Center of the Chamber of Deputies and the Memory Center of the University of Campinas – CMU / UNICAMP – 2018
- Security and Information Advisory Fond of the National Indian Foundation – ASI / FUNAI (1968–2000) – 2018

==== Regional Registry (Latin America) ====
- Fonds of Information network and Counterintelligence of the Military Dictatorship (1964–1985), together with the Public Archives of the State of Ceará, the Public Archives of Espírito Santo, the Public Archives João Emerenciano of Pernambuco, the Public Archives of Maranhão, the Public Archives of Minas Gerais, the Public Archives of Rio de Janeiro, the Public Archives of the State of São Paulo, the Archives Department of Paraná and the Information, Documentation and Archives Center – Cidarq of the Federal University of Goiás – 2011
- The War of the Triple Alliance: iconographic and cartographic representations, together with the Army Historical Archives, the Historic Archives and the Historic Map Library of the Ministry of Foreign Affairs, the Marine Heritage and Documentation Department, the National Library of Brazil, the National Museum of History, the Imperial Museum, the National Museum of Fine Arts and the Brazilian Historic and Geographic Institute – 2013

==== International Registry ====
- Fonds of Information network and Counterintelligence of the Military Dictatorship (1964–1985), together with the Public Archives of the State of Ceará, the Public Archives of Espírito Santo, the Public Archives João Emerenciano of Pernambuco, the Public Archives of Maranhão, the Public Archives of Minas Gerais, the Public Archives of Rio de Janeiro, the Public Archives of the State of São Paulo, the Archives Department of Paraná and the Information, Documentation and Archives Center – Cidarq of the Federal University of Goiás – 2011
- The War of the Triple Alliance: iconographic and cartographic representations, together with the Army Historical Archives, the Historic Archives and the Historic Map Library of the Ministry of Foreign Affairs, the Marine Heritage and Documentation Department, the National Library of Brazil, the National Museum of History, the Imperial Museum, the National Museum of Fine Arts and the Brazilian Historic and Geographic Institute – 2015
- Carlos Gomes: composer of both worlds, in conjunction with the School of Music of the Federal University of Rio de Janeiro; National Library of Brazil; Brazilian Historic and Geographic Institute (IHGB); Teatrale alla Scala Museum (Italy); Carlos Gomes Museum of the Science, Arts and Arts Center (CCLA); National Historic Museum (MHN); Imperial Museum and Museum of the Federal University of Pará (MUFPA) – 2017

=== Some documents housed by the National Archives ===
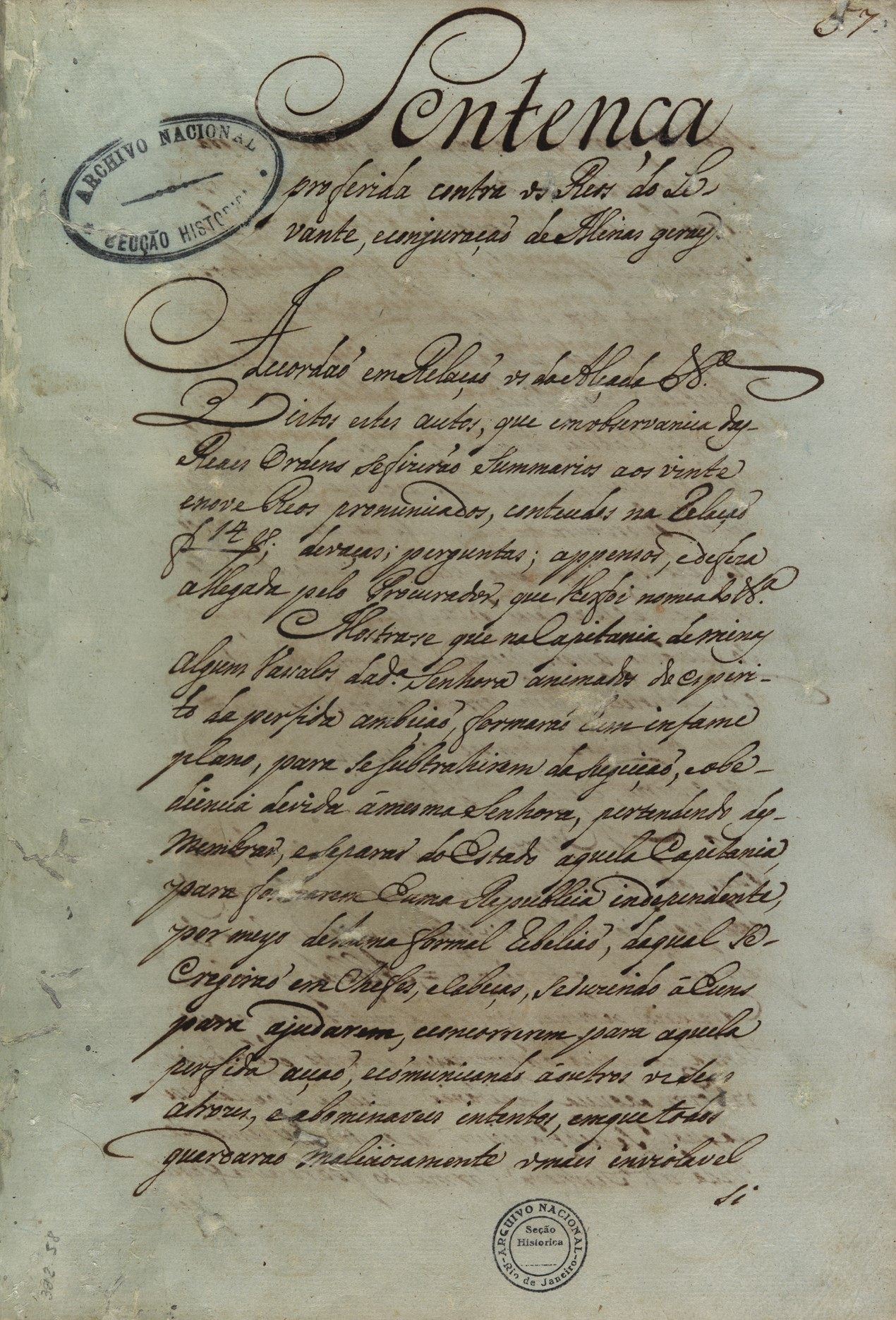
Sentence pronounced against the leaders of the Inconfidência Mineira, 1792

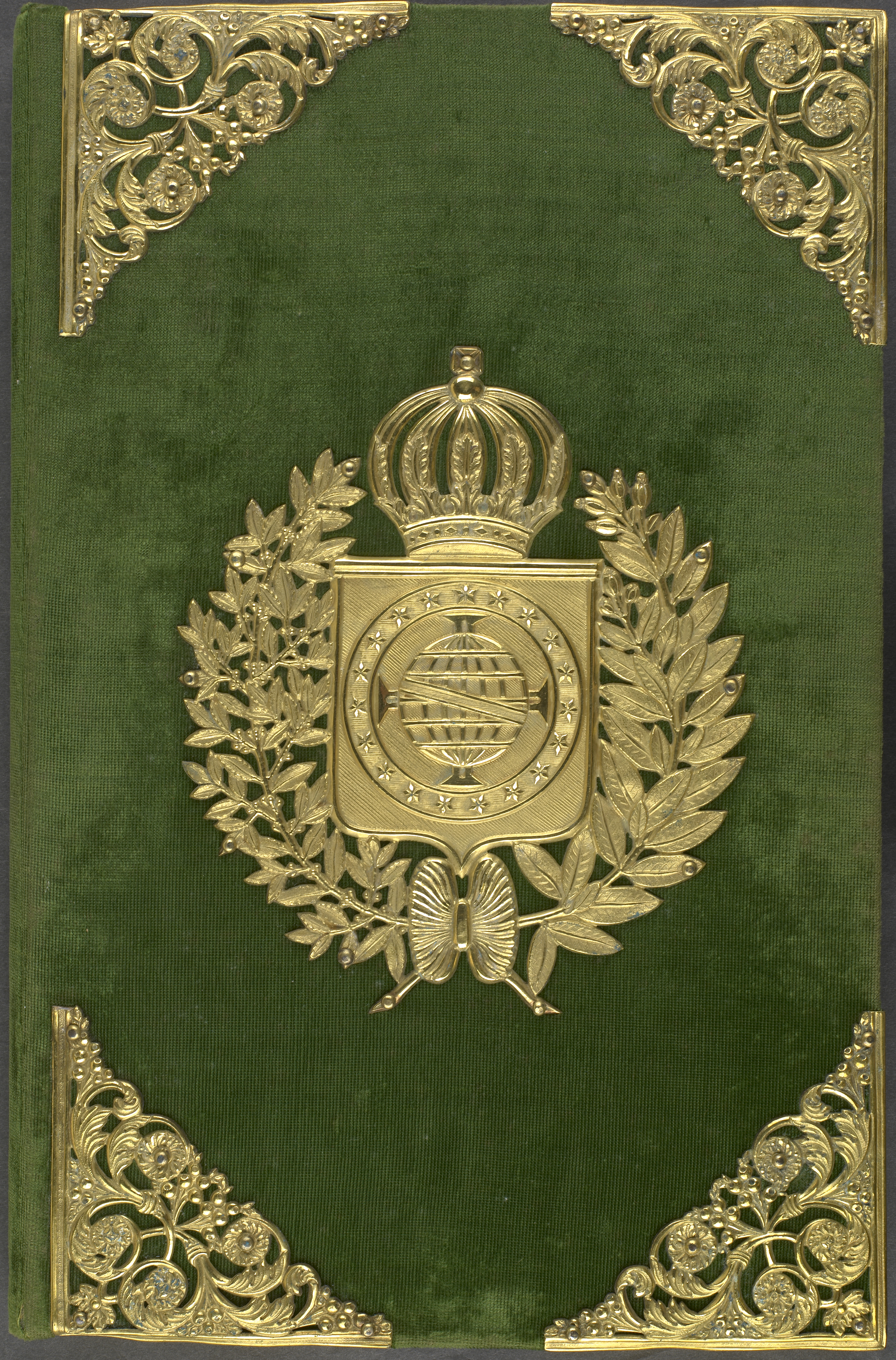
Constitution of the Empire of Brazil, 1824

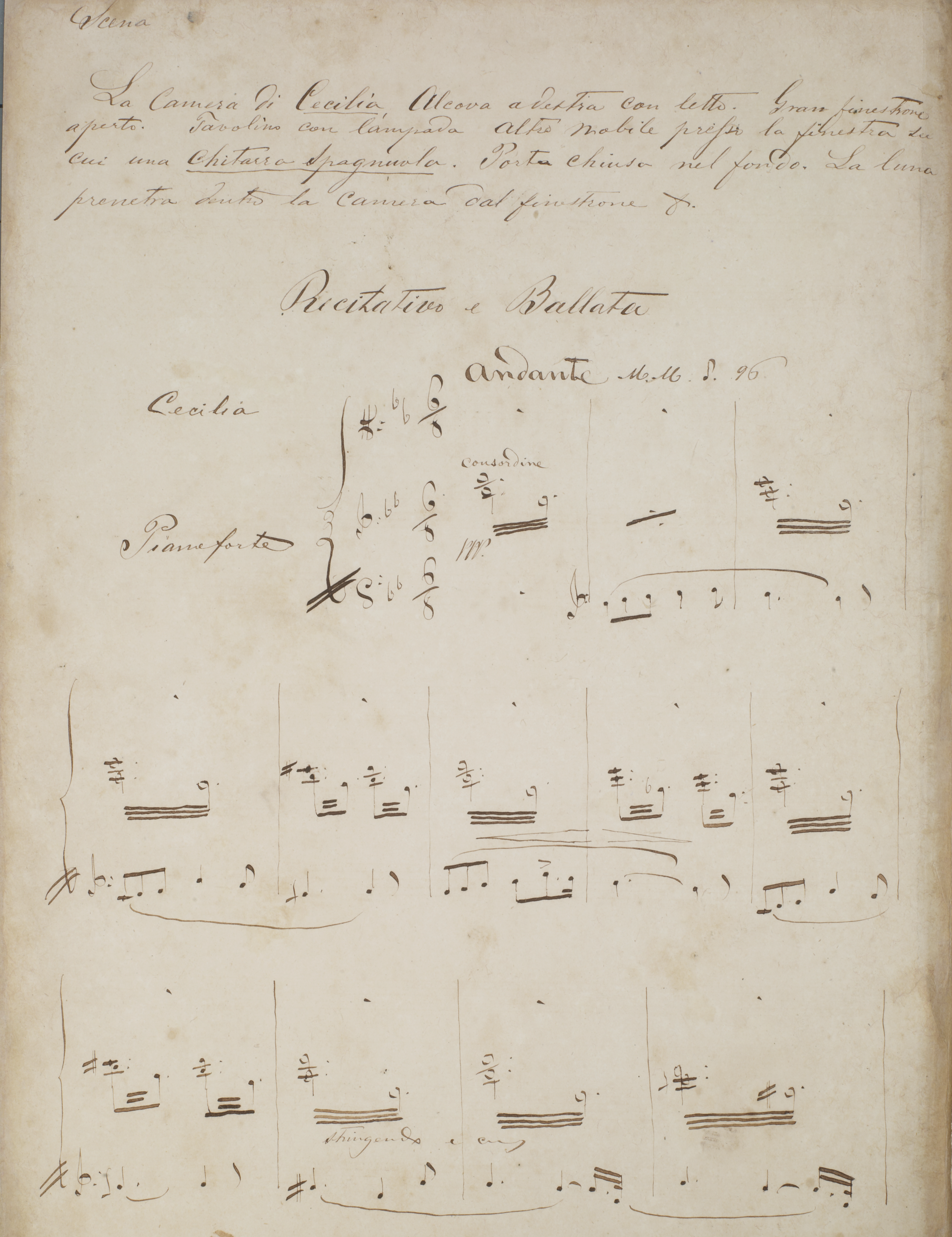
Part of the Opera Il Guarany, by Carlos Gomes, 1866

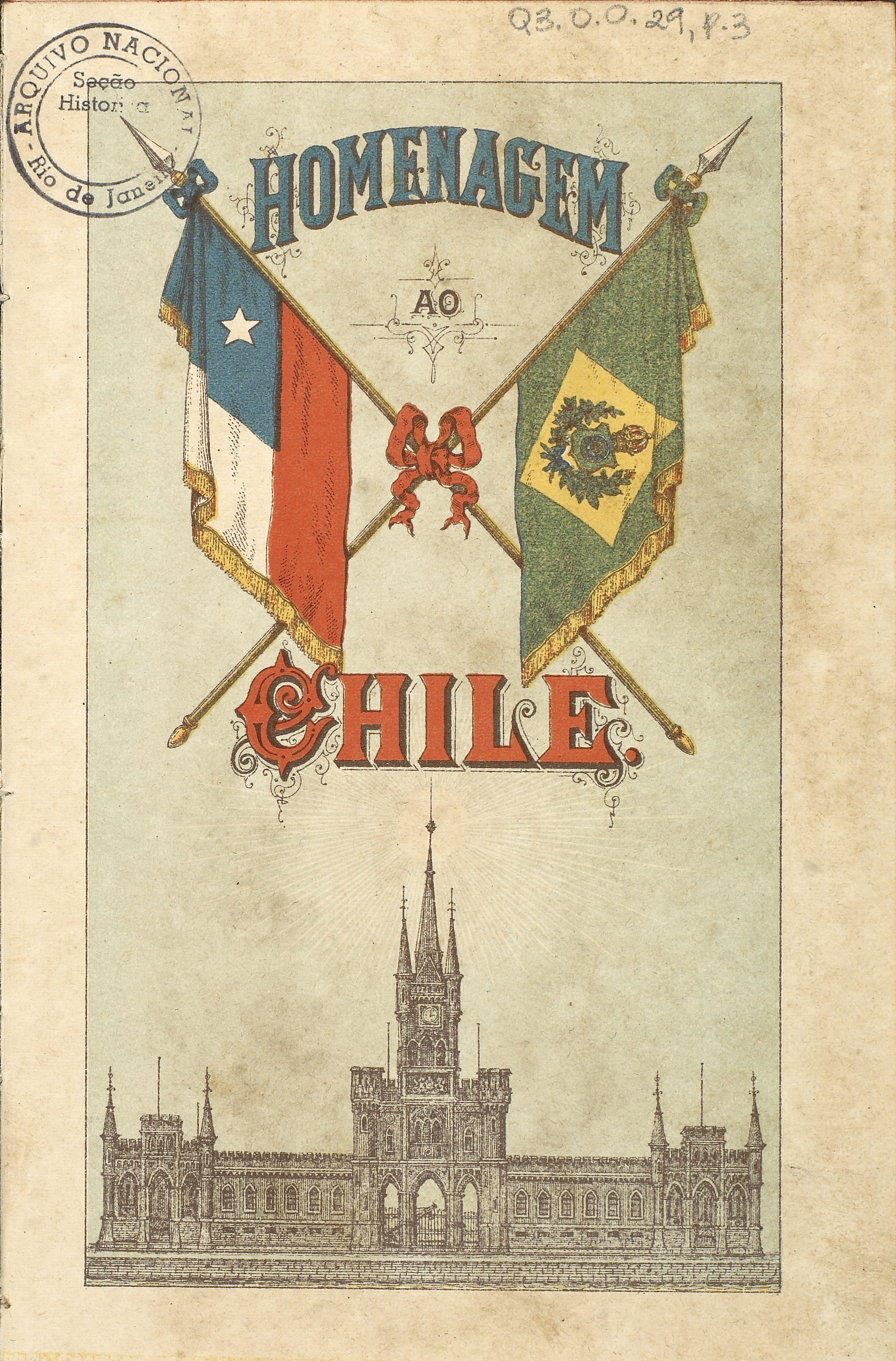
Cover of the menu of the last Dance of Fiscal Island, 1889

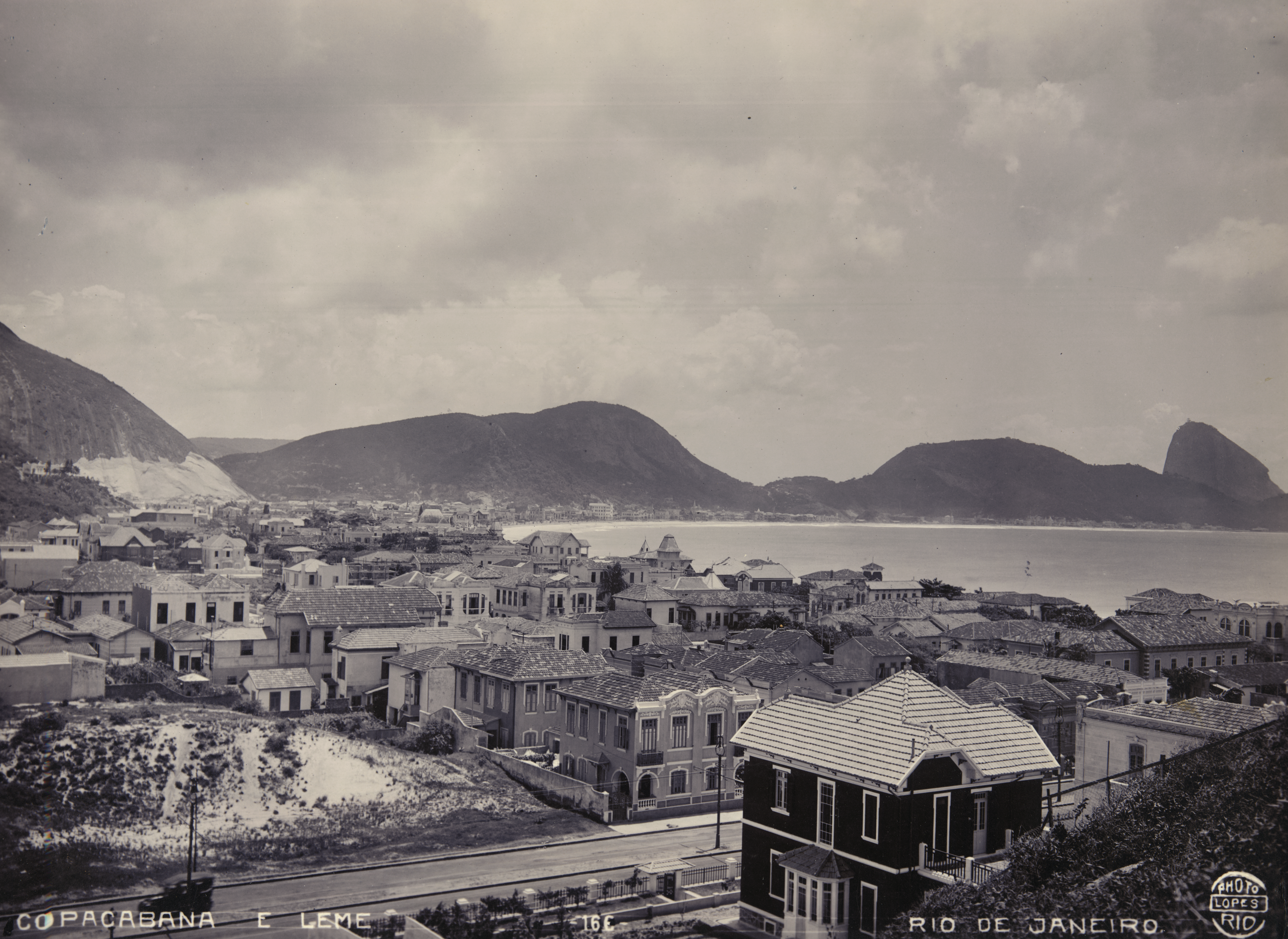
Neighborhoods of Copacabana and Leme, Rio de Janeiro, at the beginning of the 20th century

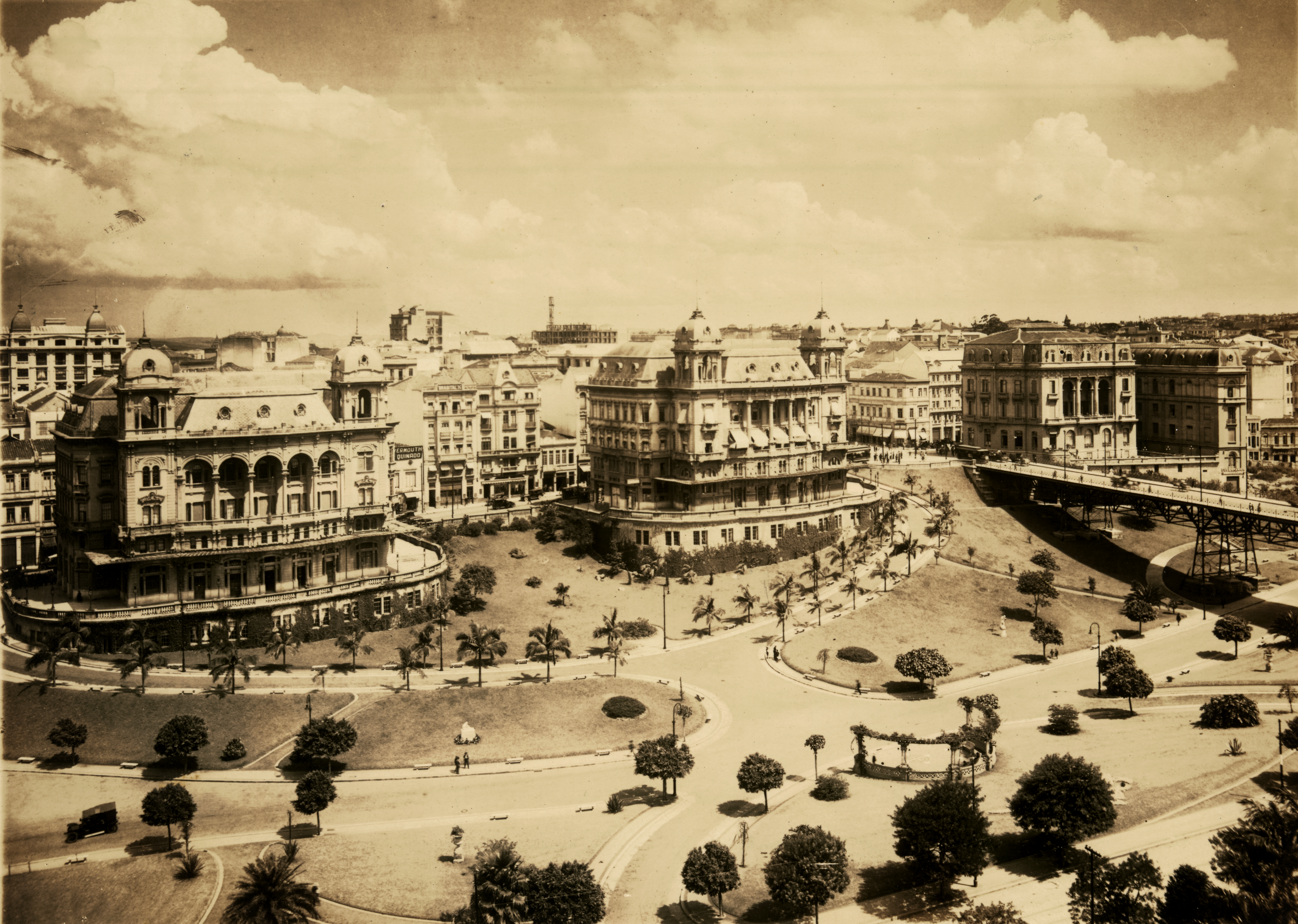
Anhangabaú Valley, São Paulo, at the beginning of the 20th century

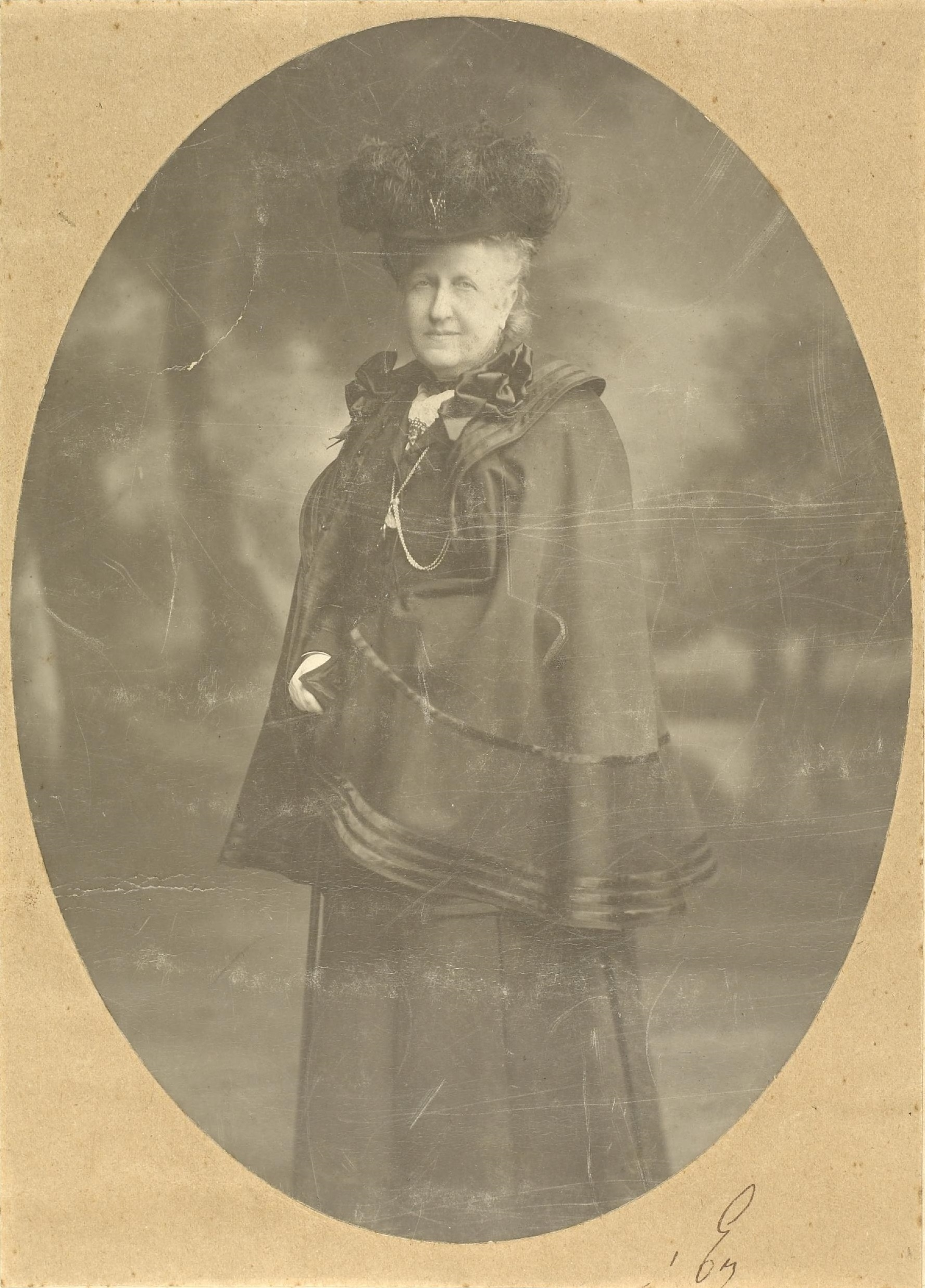
Princess Isabel, 1906

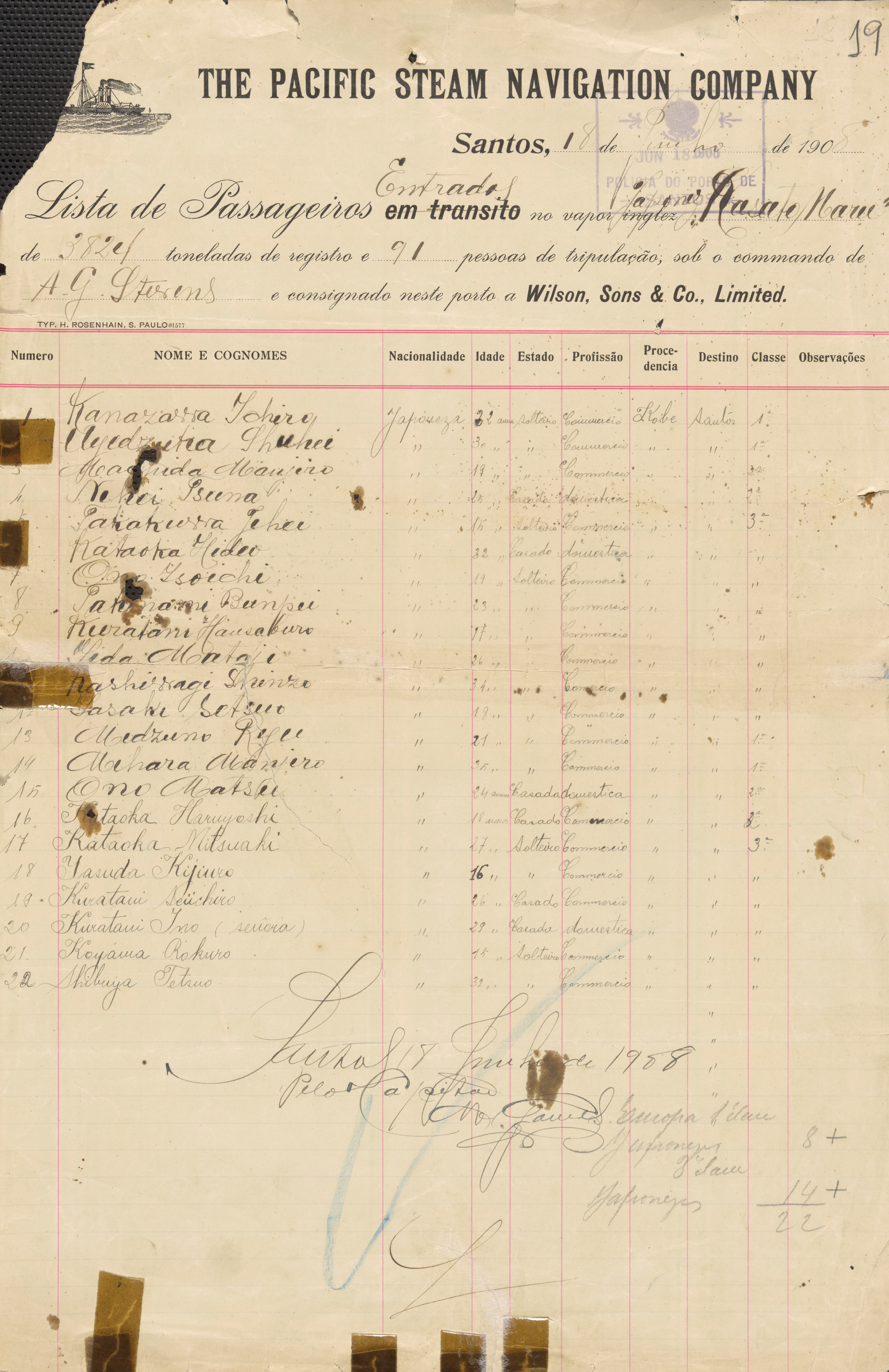
List of Passengers of Kasato Maru, 1908

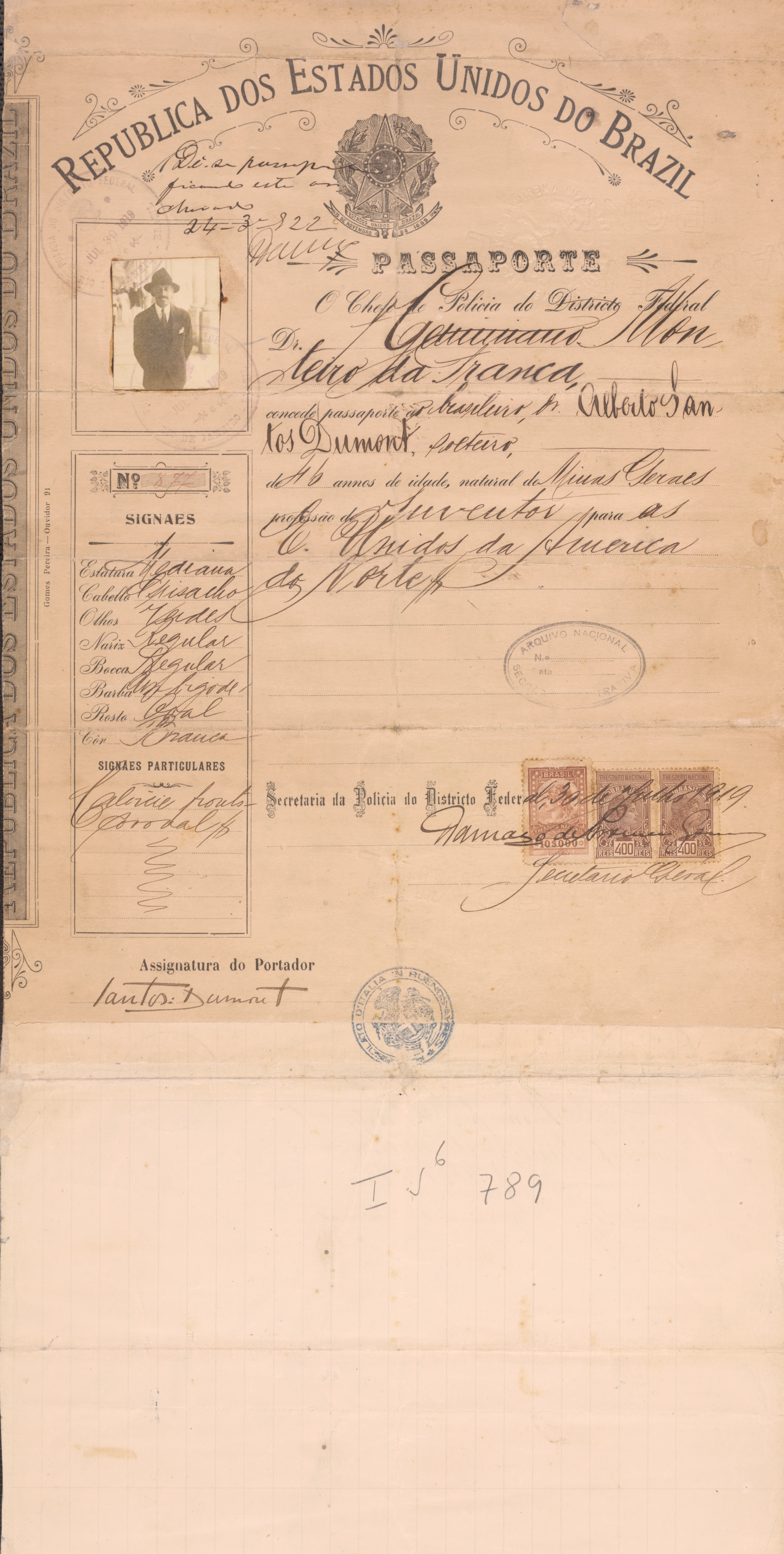
Passport of Santos-Dumont, 1919

President Artur Bernardes and Ministers of State, 1922

Plan of the 1st floor of the Palácio Monroe, 1924

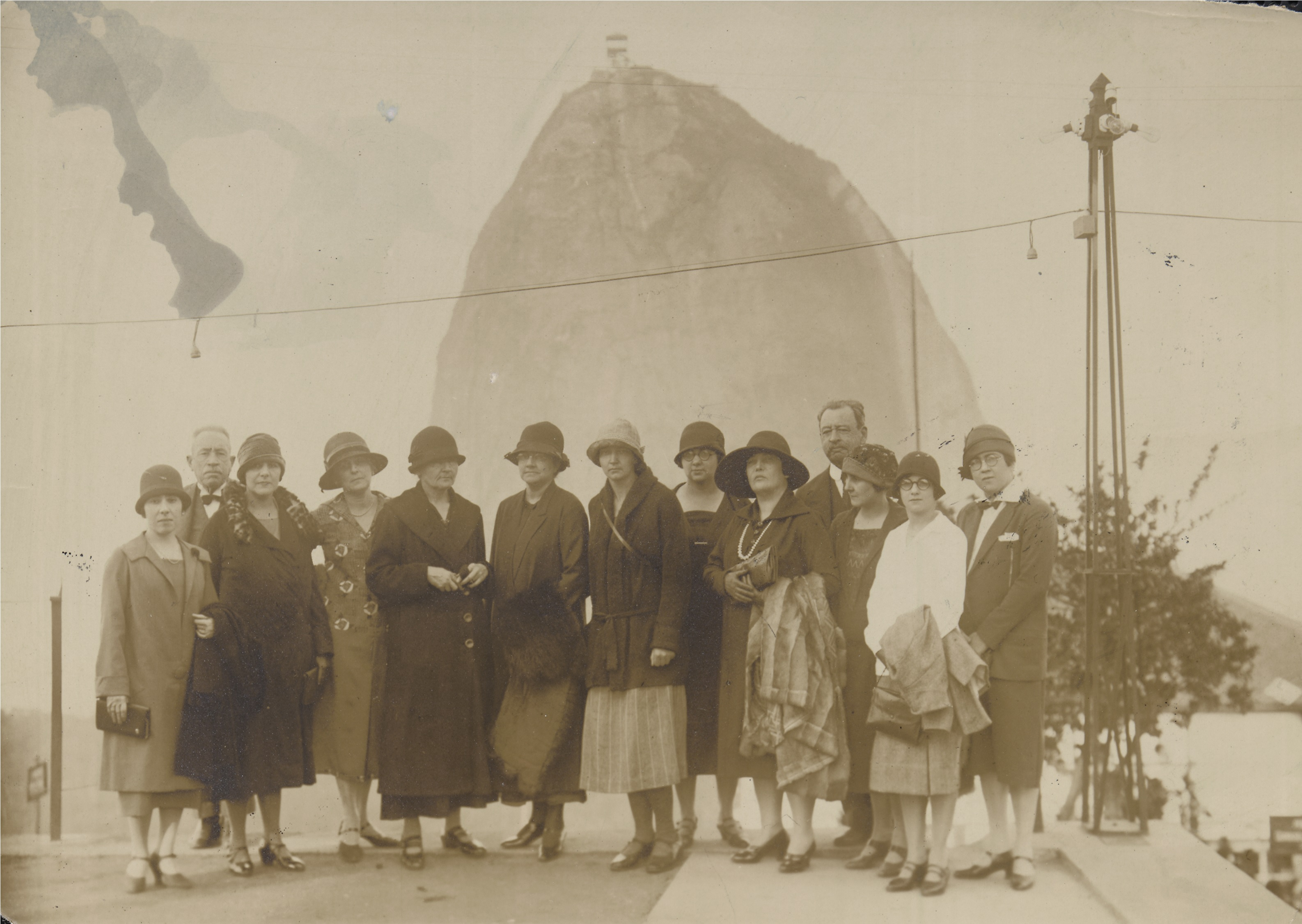
Marie Curie and members of the Brazilian Federation for Women's Progress, 1926

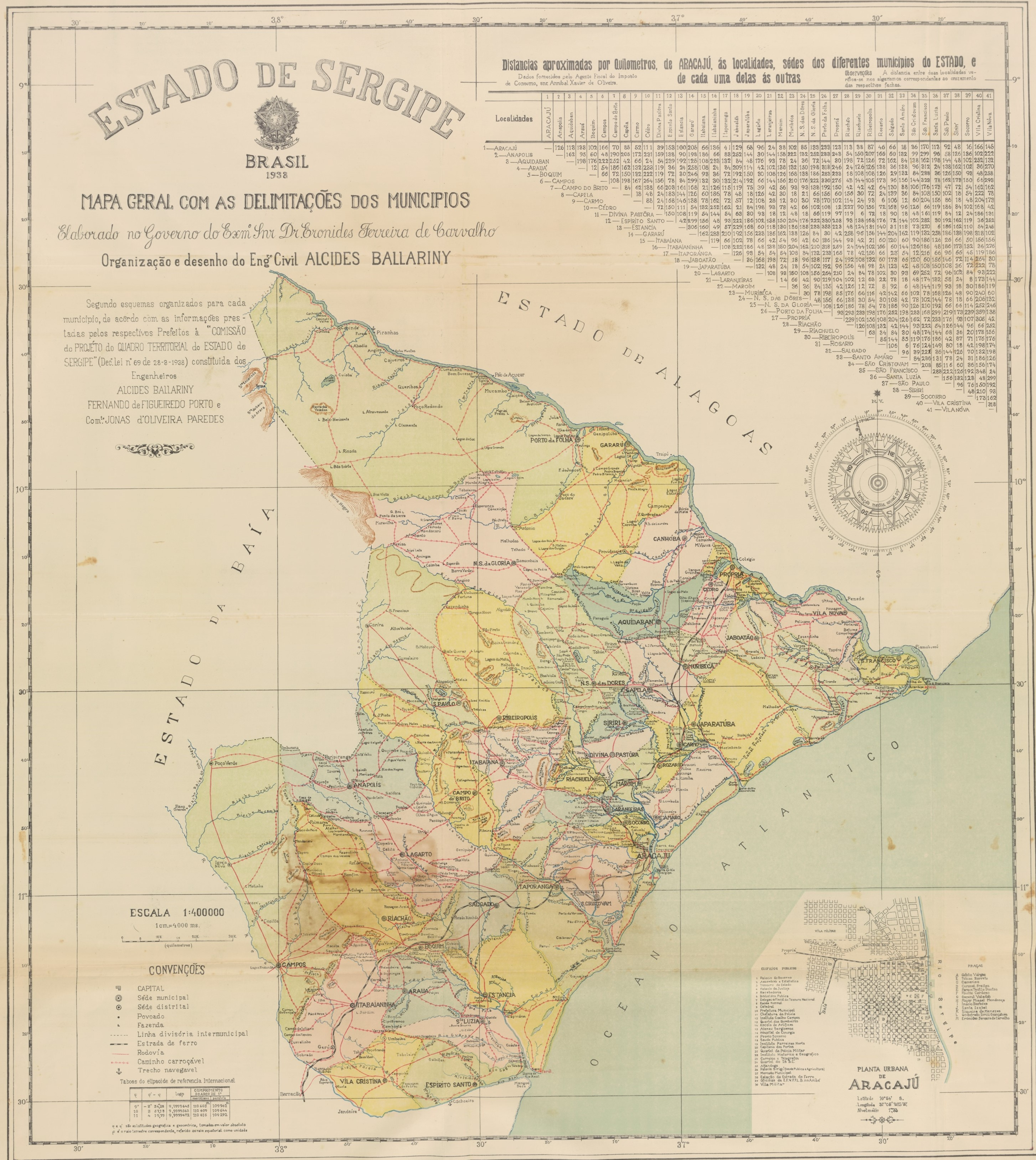
Political map of the State of Sergipe, 1937

Opening game of the Maracanã Stadium, before the 1950 World Cup

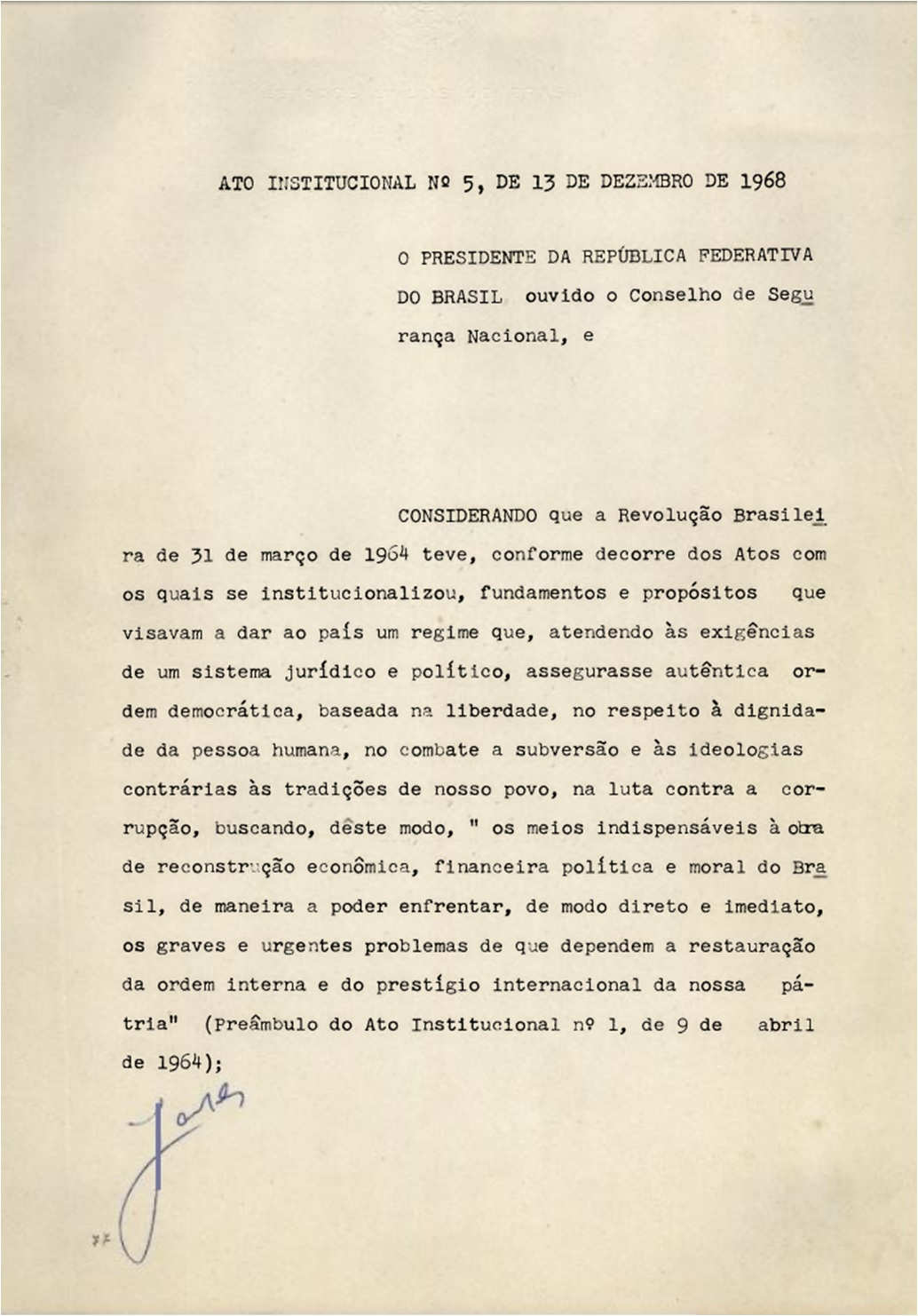
AI-5, 1968

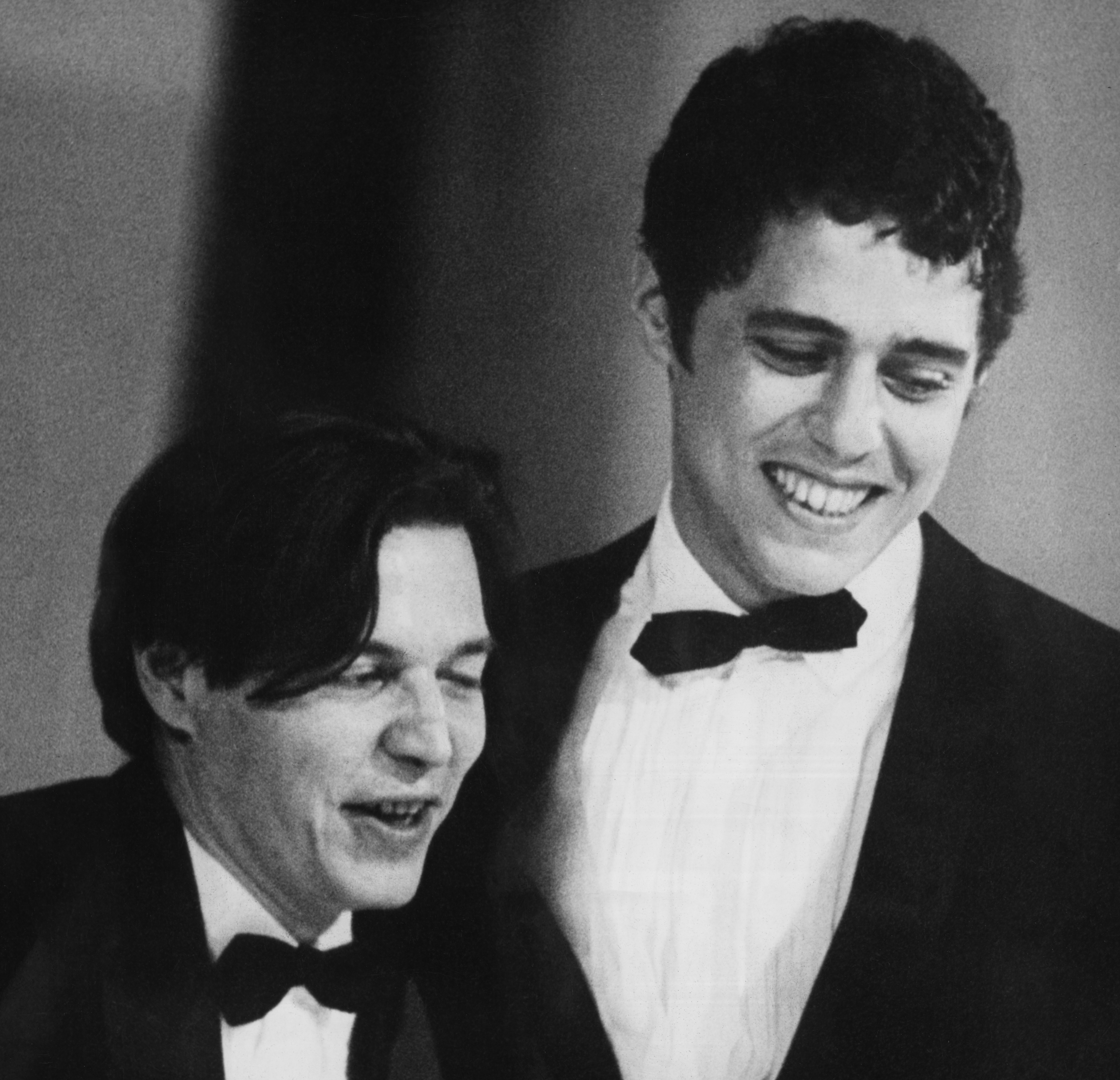
Tom Jobim and Chico Buarque at the International Song Festival (FIC), 1968

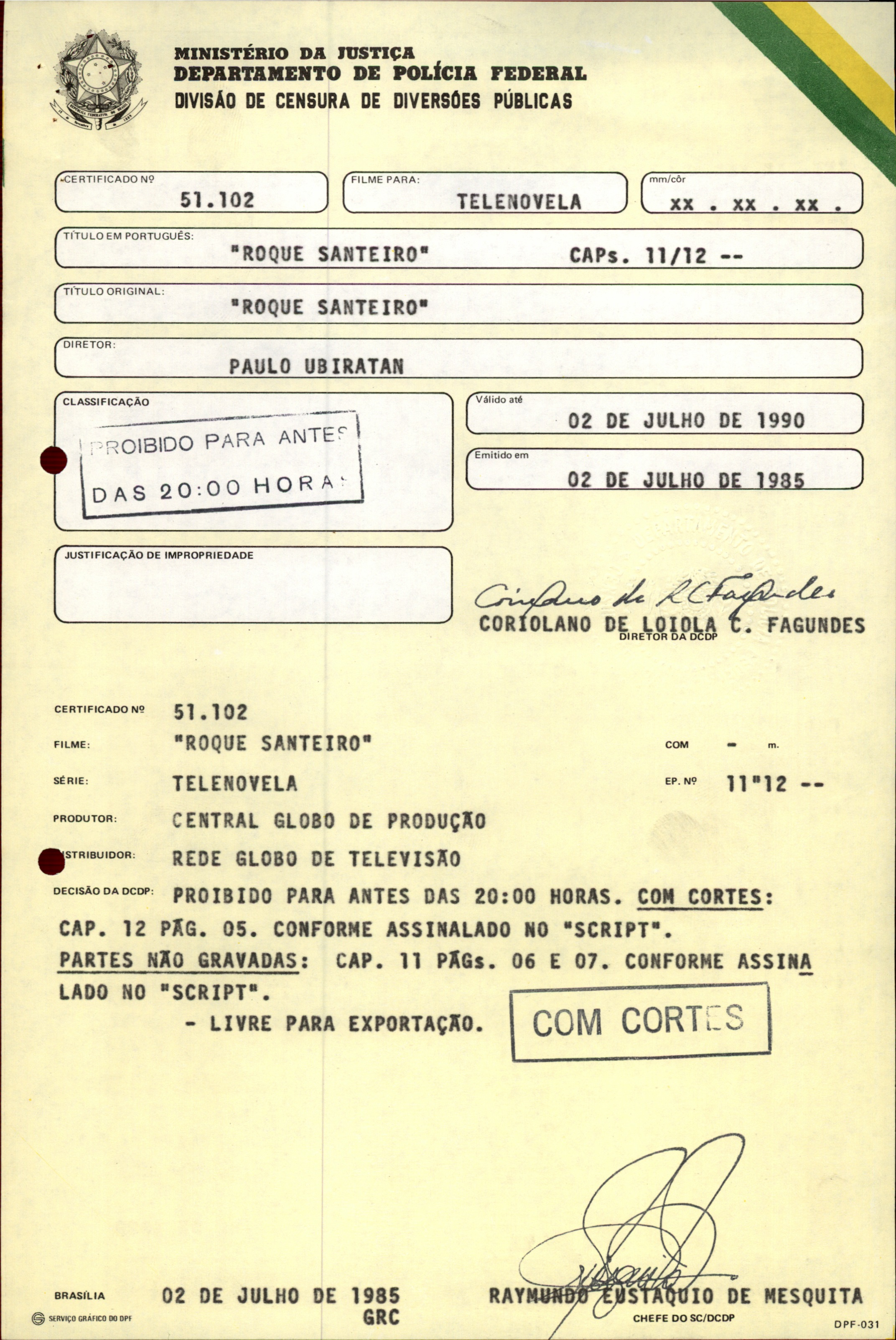
Censorship of the novel Roque Santeiro, 1985

== Libraries ==
The National Archives of Brazil has two reference libraries, especially in the areas of Brazilian History and Archival science. The library of the headquarters of the institution in Rio de Janeiro, called Biblioteca Maria Beatriz Nascimento, was created in 1876 through Decree No. 6164 of March 24, 1876. The regional library unit in Brasilia was constituted in 2016. Together, they have about 111 thousand books, brochures, magazines, theses, dissertations, CDs and DVDs, in more than twenty different languages, with 23 thousand rare books – being that of Rio de Janeiro considered the largest library in Brazil for the Archival science, especially after the reception of the bibliographic collection of the Association of Brazilian Archivists extinguished in 2015.

== Architecture ==
The current building was designed by engineers Antonio Pinheiro Guimarães Francisco and Teodoro Antonio de Oliveira in the Neoclassical style and uses gneiss. and it is one of the first property cataloged by the National Historic and Artistic Heritage Institute in 1938. From 1868 to 1983, the building housed the old Brazilian Mint. Access to the building is through a classical portal with three pediments on the same facade. Located in the center of the city of Rio de Janeiro, in the Praça da República, next to Radio MEC and the Faculty of Law of the Federal University of Rio de Janeiro, near the Central Station of Brazil. In addition to its headquarters in Rio de Janeiro, the National Archives of Brazil has, since 1988, a unit in the federal capital, Brasilia, currently located in the graphic industry sector, next to the National Press (Imprensa Nacional).

== See also ==
- History of Brazil
- List of national archives
- List of archives in Brazil
- Memory of the World Programme
