= Ana Flávia Magalhães Pinto =

Brazilian historian and academic

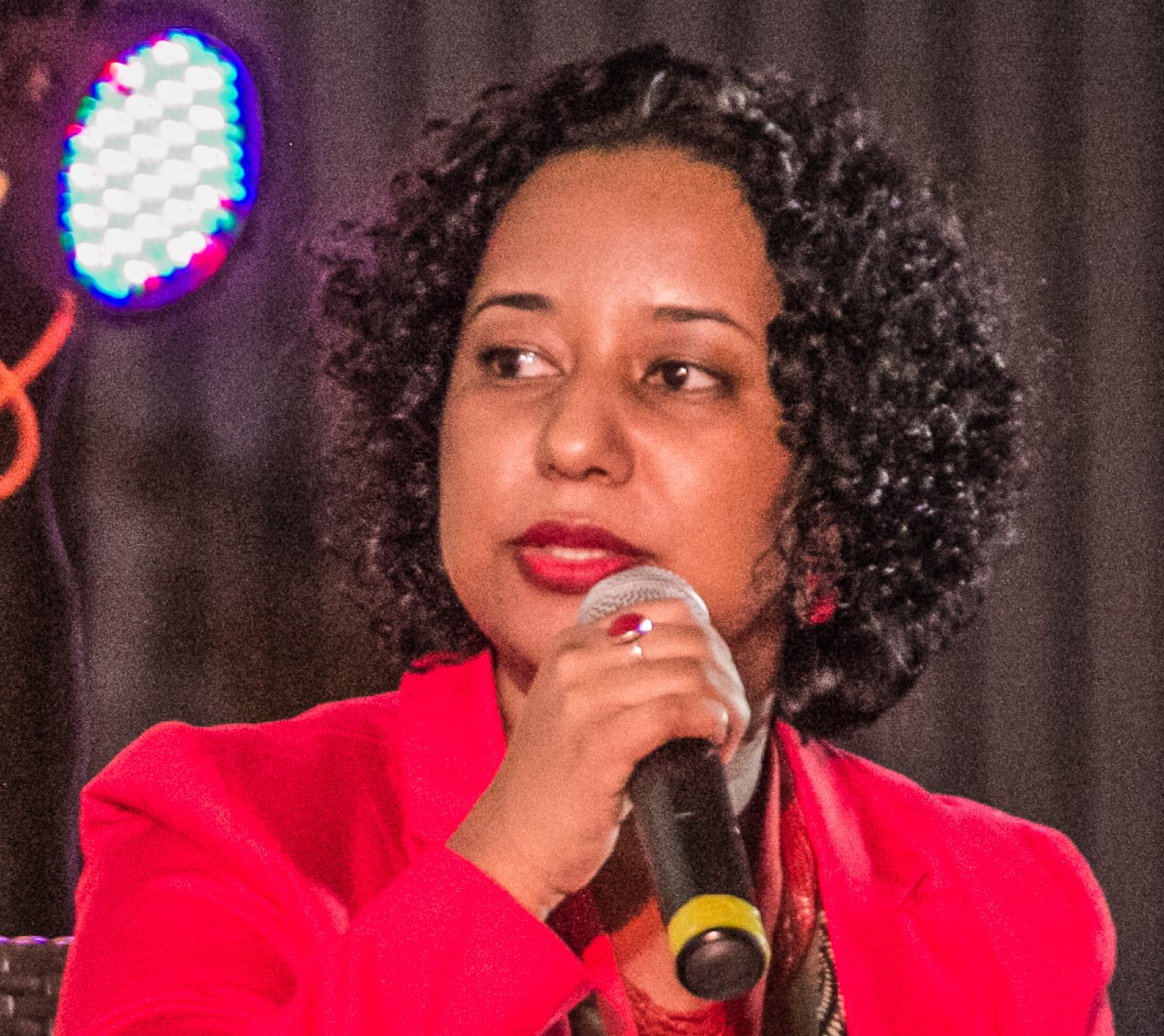
- Pinto during Festival Latinidades 2014
- Born: 1979 (age 46–47)
- Occupation: Historian

Academic background
- Education: University Center of Brasília (BA); University of Brasília (MA); State University of Campinas (PhD)

Academic work
- Institutions: Brazilian National Archives; University of Brasília

Ana Flávia Magalhães Pinto (born 1979) is a Brazilian historian and academic at the University of Brasília, where she is the only black female professor in the history department. She became the first black woman to hold the position of the Director of the Brazilian National Archives in 2023.

== Biography ==
Ana Flávia Magalhães Pinto received her BA in journalism from the University Center of Brasília in 2001, her MA in history from the University of Brasília in 2006, and her PhD in history from the State University of Campinas in 2014.

As an academic, Ana Flávia Magalhães Pinto has been involved in teaching and research activities. She is a professor of History at the University of Brasília, where she teaches in the History Department and the Postgraduate Programs in History and Human Rights. Her research interests include interdisciplinary studies in communication, literature, and human rights. Ana Flávia Magalhães Pinto has published articles, participated in conferences, and has been involved in the supervision of master's and doctoral theses. Her work aims to contribute to the understanding and appreciation of Brazil's history and diverse cultural heritage.

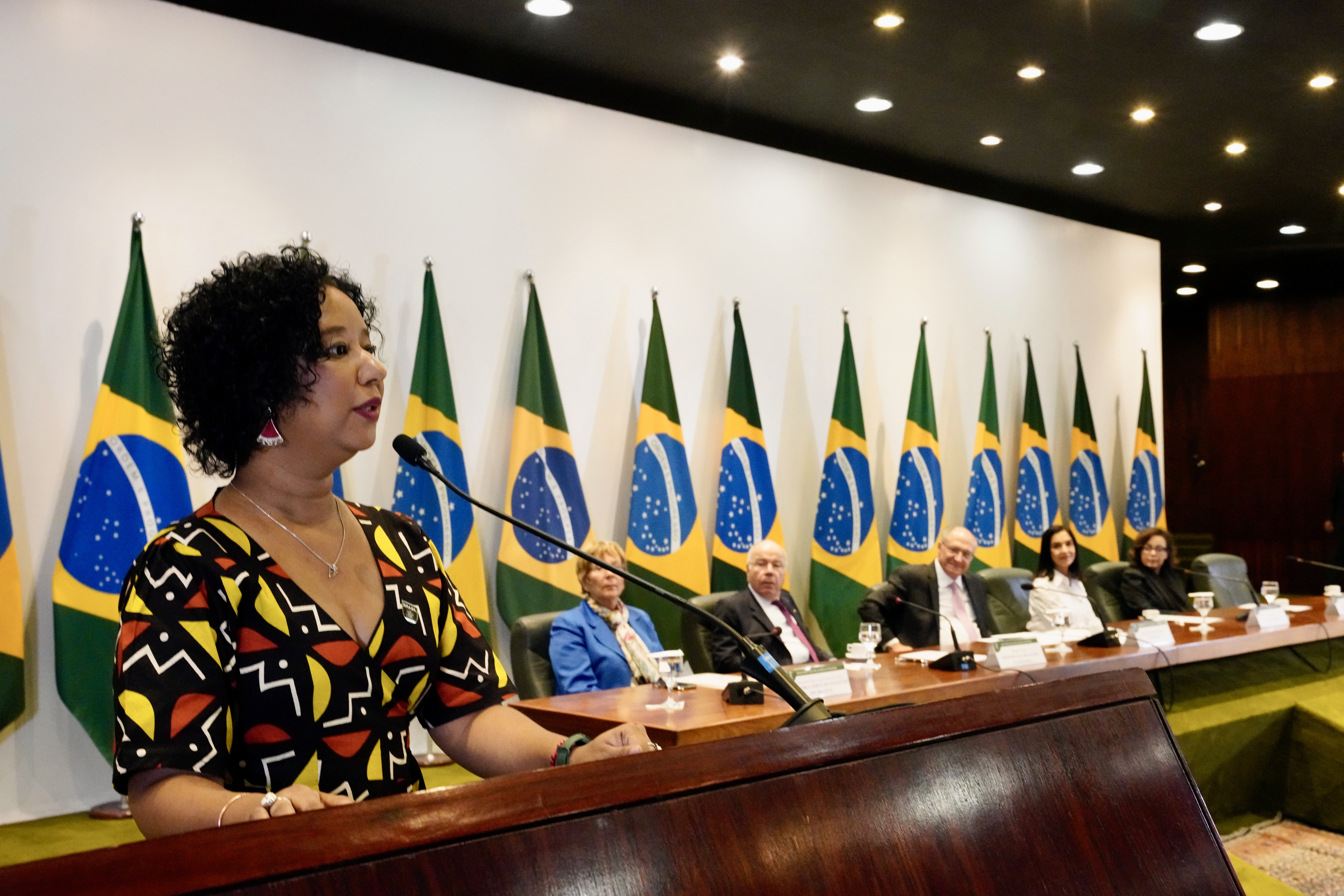
Ana Flávia in May 2025

In 2018, she launched the book Textos de Liberdade, published by State University of Campinas (Unicamp), the result of her thesis that won an honorable mention in the 2015 Capes de Tese Prize. The book addresses the trajectory of seven black men — Ferreira de Menezes, Luís Gama, Machado de Assis, José do Patrocínio, Ignácio de Araújo Lima, Arthur Carlos and Theophilo Dias de Castro — seeking to show how a network of black intellectuals that was formed to engage with the struggle for freedom and citizenship of black people in nineteenth-century Brazil.

In 2023, Ana Flávia Magalhães Pinto became the director-general of the Brazilian National Archives. She is the first black woman to hold this position in the institution's 185-year history. Her role as the director-general involves valuing and promoting the diversity of the National Archives' collection and making access to the institution more transparent. During her tenure, stated that she is dedicated to recognising the contributions of individuals who played crucial roles in shaping Brazil's history, as she has utilized public archives in her research on the political and cultural production of intellectuals.

== Works ==
- (ed. with Maria Lúcia de Santana Braga and Sales Augusto dos Santos) Ações afirmativas e combate ao racismo nas Américas. Brasília: Unesco, 2005.
- (ed. with Maria Lúcia de Santana Braga and Edileuza Penha de Souza) Dimensões da inclusão no ensino médio : mercado de trabalho, religiosidade e educação quilombola. Brasilia: Ministerio da Educacao, 2006
- Imprensa negra no Brasil do século XIX. São Paulo: Selo Negro, 2010.
- (ed. with Sidney Chalhoub) Pensadores negros – pensadoras negras, Brasil, séculos XIX e XX. Rio de Janeiro: Editora Fino Traço, 2016.
- Escritos de liberdade : literatos negros, racismo e cidadania no Brasil oitocentista. Campinas, SP, Brasil: Editora Unicamp, 2018.
