= Beatriz Nascimento =

Afro-Brazilian academic and activist

- Born: Maria Beatriz do Nascimento; 12 July 1942; Aracaju, Sergipe, Brazil
- Died: 28 January 1995 (aged 52); Rio de Janeiro, Brazil
- Occupation(s): Afro-Brazilian activist and academic
- Years active: 1960–1995

Maria Beatriz do Nascimento (12 July 1942 – 28 January 1995), known as Beatriz Nascimento, was an Afro-Brazilian academic and activist. She was an influential participant of the Black Movement of Brazil from its beginnings in the 1960s until her death. Through her academic research, she evaluated the importance of quilombos as autonomous spaces for people of African descent during the colonial period and challenged the political environment and racial policies of the government toward Afro-Brazilians. Her scholarship on the invisibility of black women, and particularly non-Anglo women of the African diaspora had an international impact on research regarding the complexities of the black experience and lack of attention focused on Afro-Latinas in transnational feminism.

== Early life ==
Maria Beatriz do Nascimento was born on 12 July 1942 in Aracaju, Sergipe, Brazil to Rubina Pereira Nascimento and Francisco Xavier do Nascimento. Her father was a mason and her mother raised their ten children. Nascimento was their eighth child. Around 1949, the family migrated south and settled in the Cordovil neighborhood of Rio de Janeiro. After completing her secondary schooling, she enrolled at the Federal University of Rio de Janeiro (UFRJ), graduating with a bachelor's degree in history in 1971. During her schooling, she became involved in the Black Movement of Brazil (Portuguese: Movimento Negro). Beginning as a student organizer, Nascimento was a co-founder of several associations and attended numerous conferences and public forum discussions on blackness and racial politics.

== Career ==
Upon graduating, Nascimento began working as an intern at the Brazilian National Archives and continued her education, studying at the Fluminense Federal University (UFF). She married Jose do Rosario Freitas Gomes and the couple subsequently had a daughter, Bethânia Gomes. While at UFF, she was involved in the founding of the Andre Rebouças Working Group, which had a significant effect on the resurgence of black identity and the politicization of race under the Brazilian military government from 1974 to 1985. Her research during this period centered on ethnographic studies in three of the surviving quilombo communities (African-Brazilian Maroon societies) in Minas Gerais. Conducting interviews and evaluating archival materials, Nascimento came to recognize quilombos as "autonomous black spaces of liberation".

In 1977, Nascimento was one of the speakers at the Quinzena do Negro (Black Fortnight), organized by Eduardo Oliveira e Oliveira at the University of São Paulo. The conference was pivotal in Nascimento's development, and was where she secured her place as an anchor in the Black Movement, through her introduction of theoretical ideas about the significance of quilombos for Afro-Brazilians and the intersection of race and gender in the political environment for black women in Brazil. She also strongly criticized the Brazilian Academy of Sciences for its racist policies. In 1978, she joined the Movimento Negro Unificado Contra a Discriminação Racial (Unified Black Movement, or MNU) and over the next decade worked with Raquel Gerber, a filmmaker, on a documentary which would become one of her most important legacies.

Nascimento completed her graduate studies at UFF in 1981 and began a master's degree program at UFRJ studying communications with Muniz Sodré, a noted Brazilian sociologist and journalist. She taught history at the Rome State School (Portuguese: Colégio Estadual Roma), in Copacabana and published articles in various newspapers and journals like Estudos Afro-Asiáticos (Afro-Asian Studies), Folha de São Paulo, Revista Cultura Vozes (Culture Voices Magazine), and Revista do Patrimônio Histórico (Historical Patrimony Magazine), while serving on the editorial board of Boletim do Centenário da Abolição e República (Centennial Bulletin of Abolition and the Republic). In 1989, Nascimento and Gerber released Ori, their documentary about the relationship between Africa and Brazil and the Black Movement in the country.

== Death and legacy ==
Nascimento was murdered on 28 January 1995 during a domestic dispute between Aurea and Antônio Jorge Amorim Viana, known as Danone. The murderer, Danone, believed that Nascimento had counseled his wife, Aurea to leave him because of their violent relationship. At the time of her death Nascimento and Gomes had separated, and she was in relationship with Roberto Rosemburg, her common law spouse. She was buried on 30 January 1995 at the Cemitério de São João Batista. With Gomes, she had a daughter named Bethânia.

Nascimento impacted international scholarship on black women, calling into question their invisibility because of patriarchy and colonialism, but also because of the over-emphasis on the English-speaking diaspora among academics and the language barriers to intellectual discourse from non-Anglo scholars. Nascimento caused feminist scholars to recognize the need for expanding research to encompass Afro-Latinas for a deeper understanding of the complexities impacting the African diaspora.

Aléx Ratts published a biography on Nascimento and her career, Eu Sou Atlântica in 2007.
