= Municipal Historical Archives of São Paulo =

Museum and archive in São Paulo, Brazil

Washington Luís Historical Archive
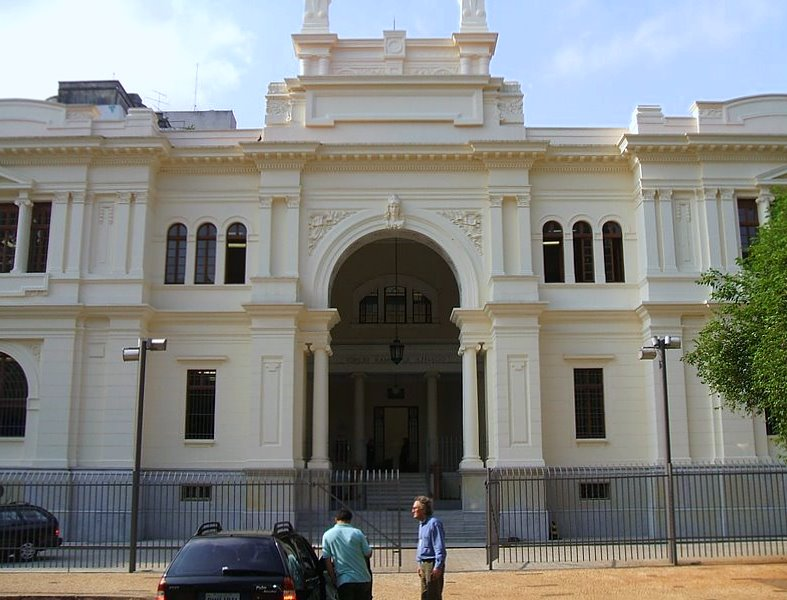
- Location: São Paulo, Brazil
- Coordinates: 23°31′47.87″S 46°38′1.56″W
- Type: Archive
- Website: http://www.arquivohistorico.sp.gov.br/

The Municipal Historical Archives of São Paulo, in Portuguese Arquivo Histórico Municipal de São Paulo (AHM), is the institution responsible for the custody, preservation, dissemination and study of documents considered to be of historical value produced or acquired by the public administration of the city of São Paulo.

The most accepted date for its foundation is October 17, 1907. For 41 years, from 1969 to 2010, it was officially called the Washington Luís Municipal Historical Archive. It was subordinated to the Department of Historical Heritage until 2012, when it became a department directly subordinated to the Office of the Municipal Secretary of Culture and served the administration of the capital of São Paulo, researchers and interested parties in general.

The institution holds a collection of approximately 4.5 million textual documents (or one thousand linear meters), covering the period from the 16th century to the first decades after the Proclamation of the Republic, as well as images and sound recordings. There are also permanent and temporary exhibitions on site.

The AHM holds custody of the Minutes of the Chamber of Santo André da Borda do Campo, from the periods between 1555 and 1558, considered the oldest documents in Latin America.

Since 2000, its headquarters have been the Ramos de Azevedo Building, formerly the building of the Polytechnic School of São Paulo, in the Bom Retiro neighborhood. Previously, the Historical Archive had occupied four other buildings.

== History ==
The start date of the collection is uncertain. At least since 1899 there are records of "archives" of the São Paulo City Hall, linked to the General Secretariat, which primarily stored documents related to the city's bureaucracy. The archive was created by law number 1.055 of 1906 to be responsible for public education services.

Law number 1.051 of 1907 created a section in charge of the services of public instruction, statistics and municipal archives. Since then, the documents in the possession of the City Hall have been systematized, organized, and subsequently disseminated.

The regulation of the archives only came four years later through Act No. 400, which was the creation of the Department of Culture of the Municipality. In 1935, the Division of Historical and Social Documentation was created, which performed the functions that are now the Municipal Historical Archives. Act No. 861/1935 states what should be done by the Historical Documentation subdivision: "collect, restore and preserve historical or old documents, putting them in a position to be consulted and published."

According to article 32 of Decree-Law No. 430 of June 8, 1947: "The Historical Archives Division is the body responsible for collecting, restoring and preserving historical and ancient papers and documents, putting them in a position to be consulted and published; to collect laws, acts and other matters that may be of interest to the administration; to propose names for public places; to promote historical competitions; to edit the Archives Magazine [...]".

Until 2010, the Municipal Historical Archives were named after the mayor, president of the province and president of the Republic Washington Luís Pereira de Sousa (1869-1957). It was during his tenure as mayor of São Paulo, from 1914 to 1919, that the publication of the Minutes of the São Paulo City Council began. In all, 82 volumes of these minutes were published, covering the period from 1562 to 1903, with the exception of some years for which the originals were not found. Until the seventh volume, the title was Actas da Camara de Vila de São Paulo. From the eighth volume onwards, the title was Minutes of the Chamber of the City of São Paulo. In addition to the minutes, 20 volumes of Letters of Dates of Land and 38 volumes of the General Register of the Chamber were also edited by the Historical Archive.

== Ramos de Azevedo building ==
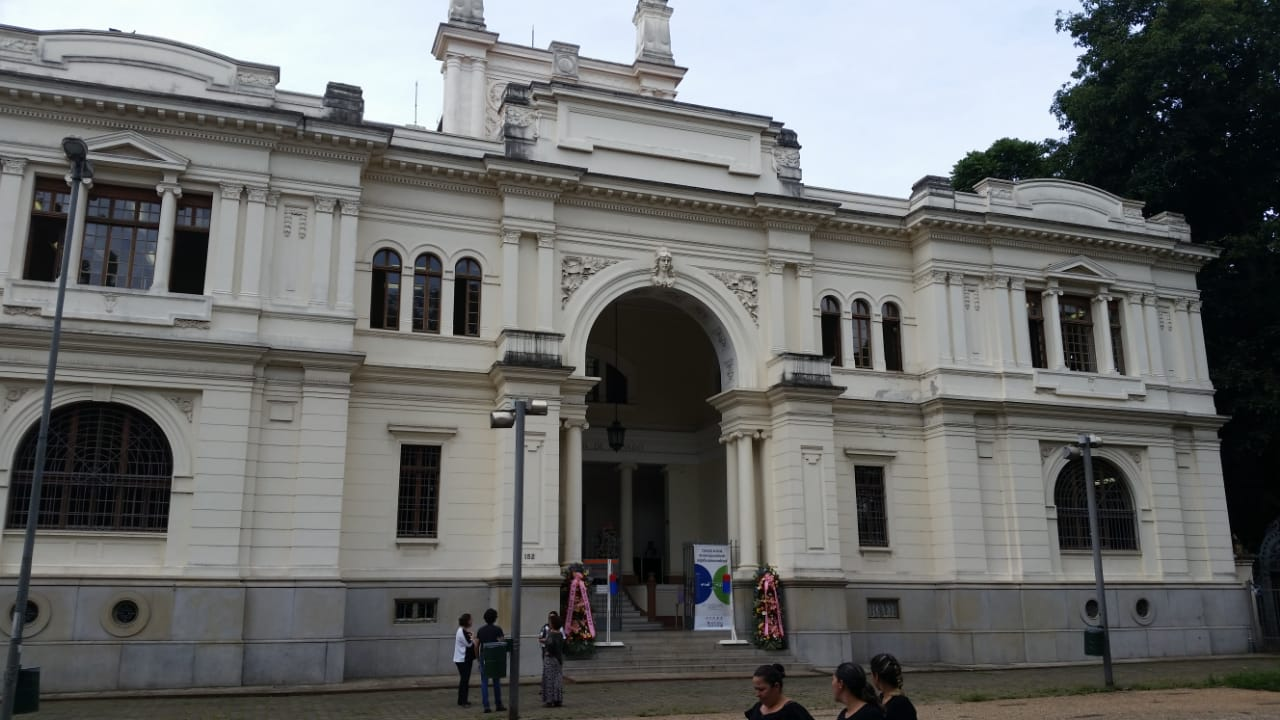
Panoramic view of the Ramos de Azevedo building, November 2018

The building was inaugurated on April 17, 1920, and the construction was under the responsibility of the office of the famous architect Francisco de Paula Ramos de Azevedo (1851-1928), whom the building is named after. Initially it was built to be an extension of the Polytechnic School, today a branch of the University of São Paulo, intended for the courses of Electrical engineering and Mechanics.

Other works by Ramos de Azevedo in the capital of São Paulo are: the Theatro Municipal, Casa das Rosas, Catavento Museum, Pinacoteca de São Paulo, Municipal Market, and Palace of Justice.

In 1987, the building became the property of the São Paulo City Hall and, in 2000, after being subjected to renovations, it was opened to the public already housing the Municipal Historical Archive. In addition to the AHM, the Municipal Council for the Preservation of the Historical, Cultural and Environmental Heritage of the City of São Paulo and the Directorate of the Department of Historical Preservation are also housed there.

Architecturally, the building has two stained glass windows made by the Casa Conrado atelier, the same company that made the stained glass windows of the Municipal Market. The flights of stairs that give access to the second floor were made by the São Paulo School of Arts and Crafts.

== Structure ==
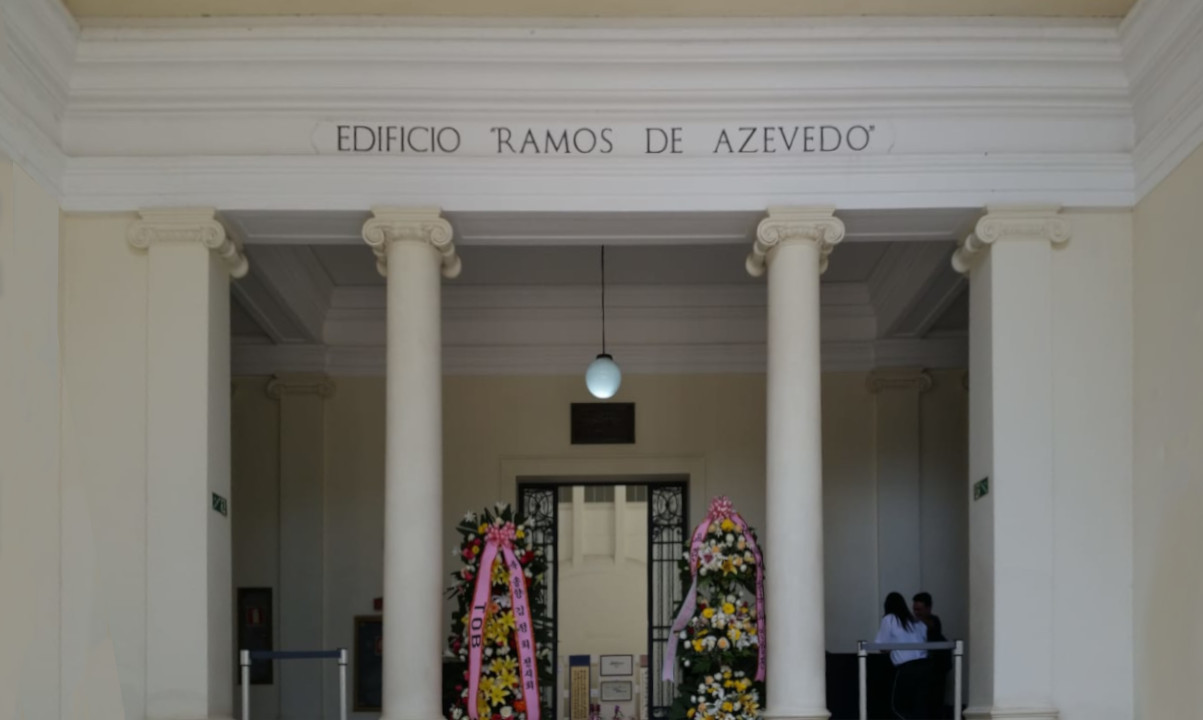
Entrance to the building that houses the Historical Archives of São Paulo

The AHM is composed of the Ramos de Azevedo Building and two other annex buildings. One, known as "Torre da Memória" (former Casa do Politécnico) houses the Library and a technical reserve; the other is where the archives are available for consultation.

The library has a collection of approximately 7,000 copies of books, the periodicals library has 2,700 copies of periodicals and an archive of newspaper and magazine clippings with about 900 folders on the history of neighborhoods, buildings and the city. Almost all of the copies are focused on the history of São Paulo and the city administration. The library also has a collection of rare works. Information on the institution's bibliographic collection is part of the Municipal Library System, which can be consulted on the internet.

== Subdivisions ==
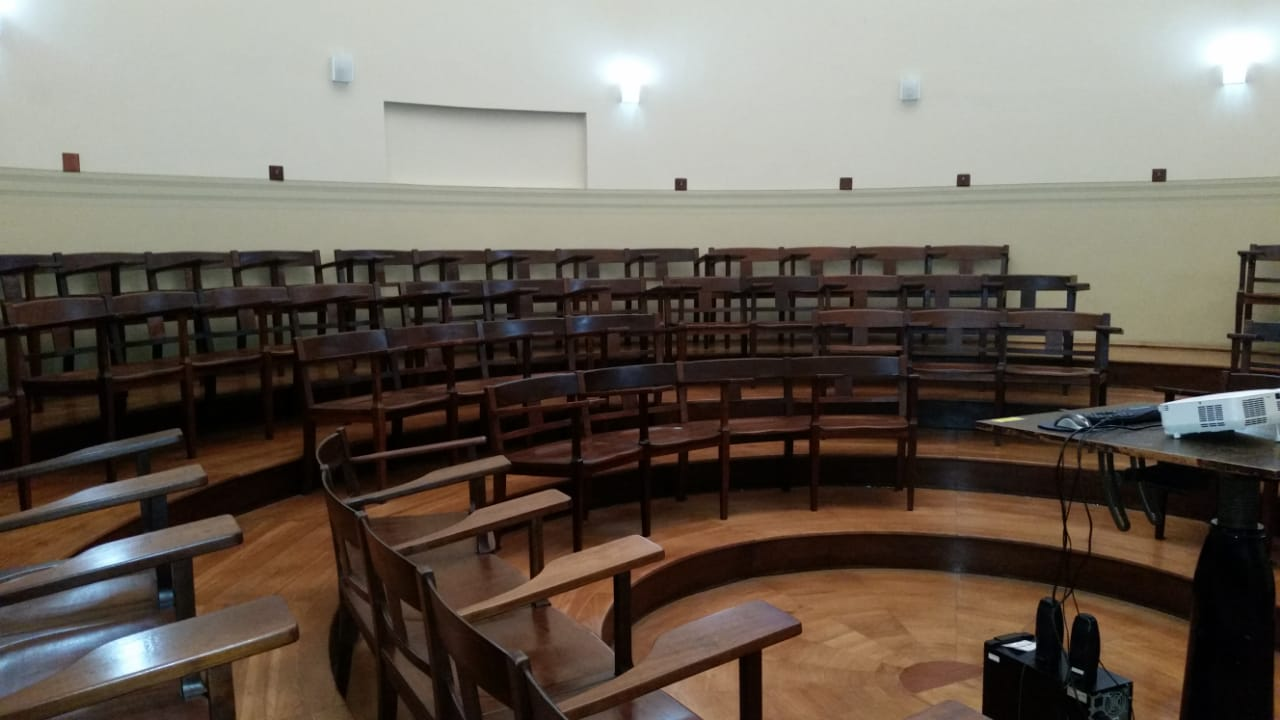
Restored amphitheater of the former Polytechnic School

The Municipal Archive is organized into subdivisions, which were formerly called sections. The Historical Documentation Subdivision comprises documents that have met specific requirements of relevance and time of publication. The Subdivision of Social Documentation and Municipal Statistics deals more directly with files related to public administration. Before being made available for consultation, the documents are sanitized and catalogued.

For the 1936 Act (art. 217), "paper and historical or old documents are the ones that have existed in the Municipal Archives for more than 30 years."

Among the subdivisions there is also a specialized archive listing the names of the city's streets and squares.

== Other headquarters ==
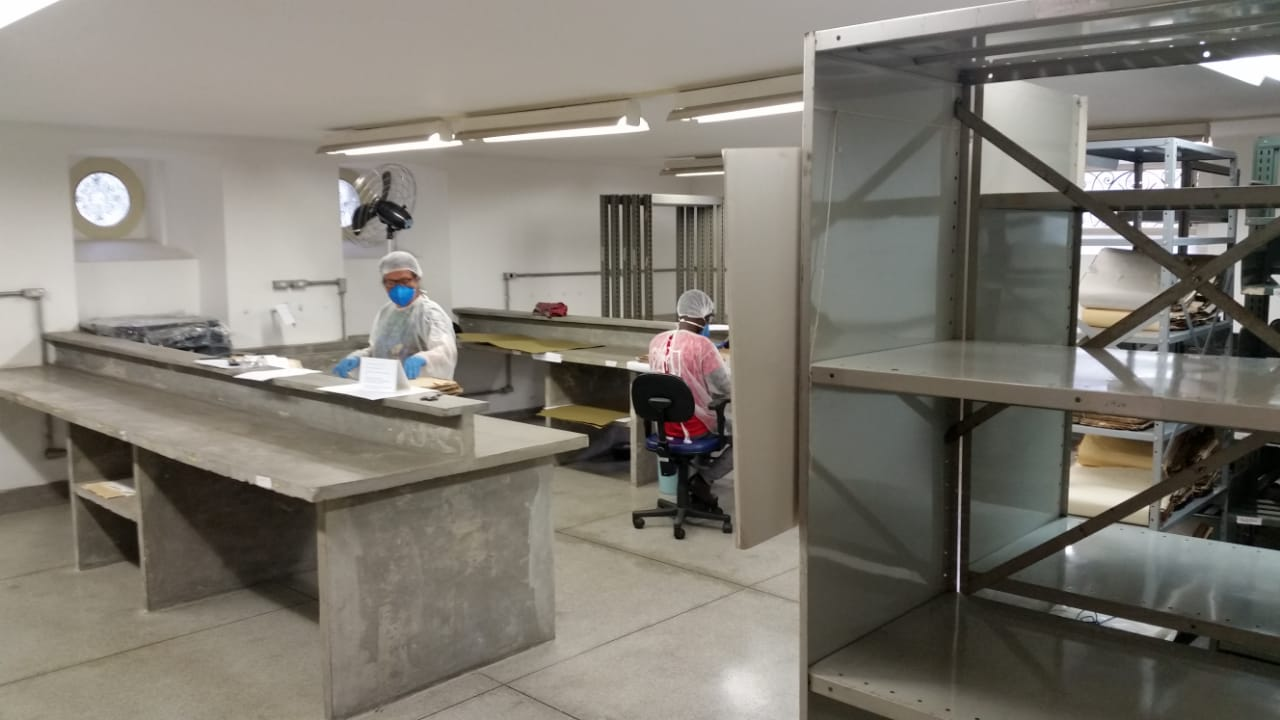
In the basement of the building there are rooms for the restoration and preservation of documents

Before occupying the Ramos de Azevedo Building, the Municipal Historical Archives were based in several buildings in the city. In the 1950s the institution was located together with several organs of the Department of Culture, on Rua da Cantareira, in the city center.

The institution was also housed on the streets Rua Brigadeiro Tobias and Rua da Consolação, in the former headquarters of Chácara Lane. Then, after a restoration process, it was transferred to House No. 1, near the Pátio do Colégio (ground zero of the capital of São Paulo).

Since 2000, it has been located in the Ramos de Azevedo Building, at Praça Coronel Fernando Prestes in the Bom Retiro neighborhood. In addition to the AHM, the Paula Souza Building, now belonging to FATEC, the Headquarters of the General Command of the Military Police, the Parish of Nossa Senhora Auxiliadora, and the Prudente de Moraes State School are located in this square.

== Magazine ==
The magazine of the Municipal Archives was created in June 1934. At the time the mayor of the city was Antônio Carlos de Assumpção. One of the aims of the magazine was to publish in full the historical documents held in the collection.

A year after its launch it was incorporated into the newly created Department of Culture and Recreation and began to circulate monthly. The editorial line was diversified and articles by foreign authors and research on history, ethnology, sociology, anthropology and issues related to the preservation of national memory were published.

The magazine gradually gained prominence and became an important communication vehicle for the São Paulo and Brazilian intelligentsia. In the 1930s, the magazine was even distributed in other countries, with a record circulation of 2000 copies.

In addition to the transcription of documents held in the Archives, studies by authors such as Afonso de Taunay, Caio Prado Jr., Mário de Andrade, Paulo Duarte, Claude Lévi-Strauss, Florestan Fernandes and Antônio de Alcântara Machado were also published.

The magazine did not have a regular periodicity for much of the time, it went ten years without circulating and was resumed in 2002. Among the most outstanding volumes are those that honored the 70th anniversary of the publication itself and the 450th anniversary of the city of São Paulo.

== Photo collection ==
The Historical Archives of São Paulo still has a collection of photographs that have been available for consultation for about ten years. The iconographic collection that presents great historical value has images produced mainly in the first half of the 20th century.

The main themes revolve around the municipal actions developed in the urban structure, especially in the area where urban expansion occurred more rapidly, between the 1920s and 1950s.

The photographs have three predominant themes:

1. Urban documentation: records of daily life in the city, such as paving, road openings and construction of public buildings.
2. Press office: coverage of official actions of the mayors, such as inaugurations and political events.
3. Private funds: these are the most recent and record the public and private social life of the original owners of the collection, for example through family portraits and domestic environments.

There are about 5,000 photographs, including albums, montages, positives (reversal films) and simple negative films. Most of the collection of photographs is available on the internet.

== Dictionary of streets ==
The AHM developed a tool entitled Dicionário de Ruas (Dictionary of Streets) that allows access to information on the names of public places in the capital of São Paulo. Data from the documentation available at the institution were compiled for the creation of the website.

== ArquiAmigos ==
The Friends of the Municipal Historical Archive Association (Associação Amigos do Arquivo Histórico Municipal) was created on September 24, 2008. The institution aims to contribute to the cultural, technical and administrative improvement of the Municipal Historical Archive and to foster among the population the values of the right to Memory and the guarantee of universal access to information. The Association produces a newsletter about the Archive.

== Collection ==
The following are examples of the collection: maps and bulletins referring to population censuses; revenue and expenditure books of the City Council; the current account and cash books of the municipality; tomb books; cemetery books; and the protocol books, entry and exit of papers of the City Council and the São Paulo City Hall.

== See also ==
- Public Archives of the State of São Paulo
- National archives
