= Bom Sucesso =

Bom Sucesso may refer to:

== Places ==
=== Brazil ===
- Bom Sucesso, Minas Gerais, municipality in the state of Minas Gerais.
- Bom Sucesso, Paraíba, municipality in the state of Paraíba.
- Bom Sucesso, Paraná, municipality in the state of Paraná.
- Bom Sucesso do Sul, municipality in the state of Paraná.
- Bom Sucesso de Itararé, municipality in the state of São Paulo.
- Bonsucesso, neighborhood of Rio de Janeiro

=== Portugal ===
- Bom Sucesso (Alverca), a civil parish in the municipality of Alverca
- Bom Sucesso (Figueira da Foz), a civil parish in the municipality of Figueira da Foz

== Others ==
- Bom Sucesso (TV series), a 2019 Brazilian telenovela.
- Bonsucesso Futebol Clube, football team from Bonsucesso, Rio de Janeiro, Brazil
- Eva Maria Bonsucesso, 19th century Brazilian street vendor
