= Aline Valek =

Brazilian novelist and science fiction writer

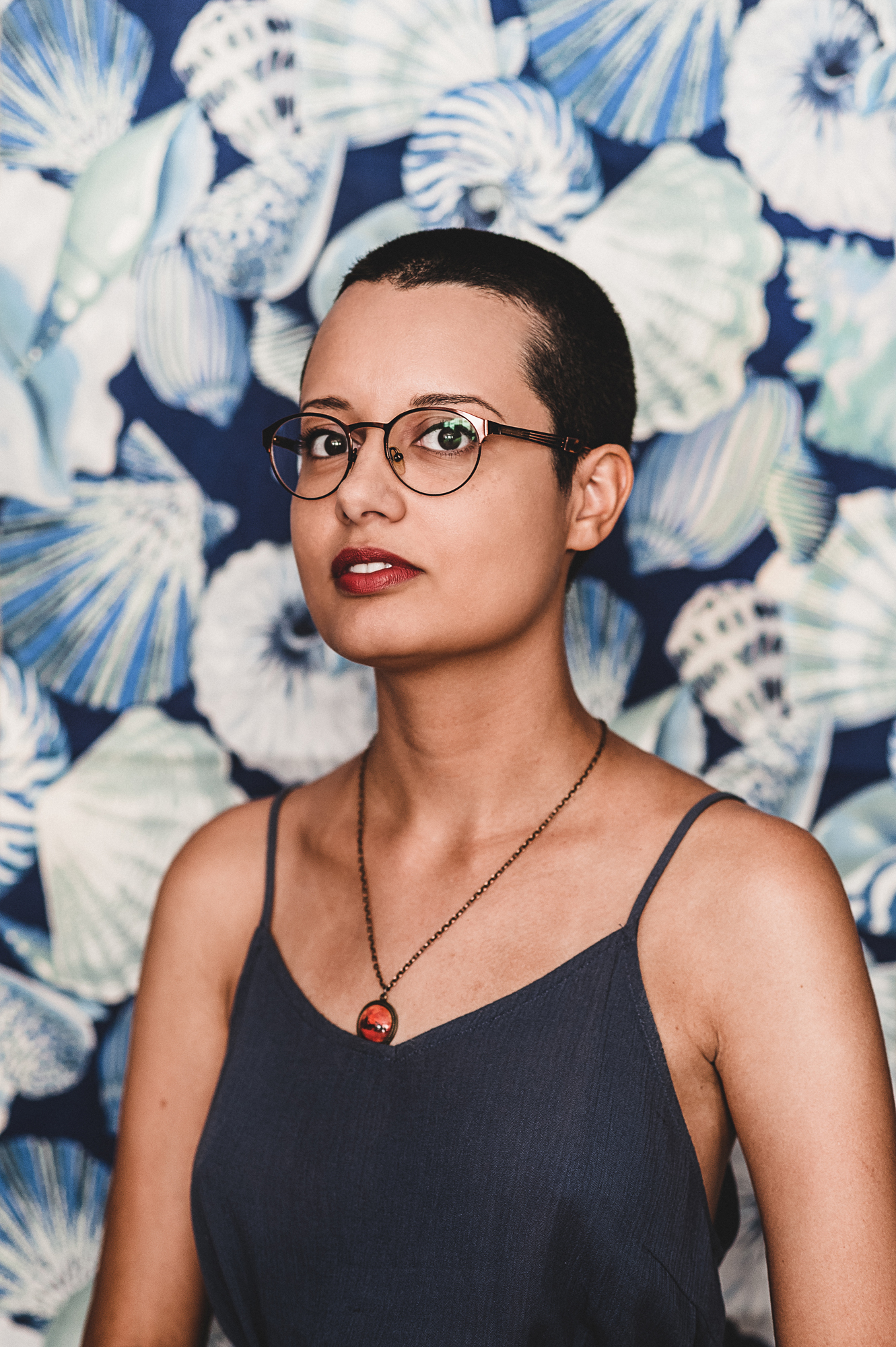
- Born: 29 July 1986 (age 40); Governador Valadares, Minas Gerais, Brazil
- Education: Higher Education Institute of Brasília, B.A.
- Occupations: author, writer, novelist, editor, and illustrator
- Employer: Carta Capital
- Website: http://www.alinevalek.com.br/blog/

Aline Valek (born 29 July 1986) is a Brazilian writer, novelist, editor and illustrator. She is from Governador Valadares, Minas Gerais but moved to Brasília early in her life. She graduated in Advertising and Propaganda at the Higher Education Institute of Brasília, Brazil. She has published two books and currently works as a columnist for Carta Capital, a Brazilian weekly magazine.

== Literature and other activities ==
Valek's first book is called Hipersonia Cronica (2014) and is about Jonatan who suffers from a serious sleep problem. Her second book, Pequenas Tiranias (2015), is a trilogy of short stories about the everyday lives of common people.

== Illustrations ==
As an illustrator, Valek drew the cover and chapters of Jarid Arraes' book – As Lendas de Dandara (2015). This book is about Dandara, a black woman slave, who becomes a warrior and fights for her freedom and against slavery. Moreover, Valek edited and illustrated the cover of the first Brazilian translation of Rokeya Sakhawat Hussain's book Sultana's Dream which was first published in the Indian Ladies Magazine in Madras in 1905. This book is considered one of the first work of Indian feminist science fiction in English. According to Subramanian, Sultana's Dream is a feminist utopia in which the main focus is women's education.

== Feminist activism ==
In one of her interviews, Valek explains that science fiction can be a tool used by feminist writers to raise questions about gender roles, transphobia, race, and sexuality. Within feminist science fiction, Valek and Lady Sybylla organized a collection of ten short stories called Universo Desconstruido.

== Published works ==
- 2014 - Hipersonia crônica (independent) - short stories
- 2015 - Pequenas tiranias (independent) - short stories
- 2016 - As águas-vivas não sabem de si (Rocco) - novel
- 2018 - Bobagens imperdíveis para ler numa manhã de sábado (independent) - crônicas
- 2020 - Cidades afundam em dias normais (Rocco)- novel
- 2021 - Bobagens Imperdíveis para atravessar o isolamento: Crônicas fantásticas (independent) - short stories

== See also ==
- Clarice Lispector
