= Carolina Maria de Jesus =

Brazilian outskirts memorialist (1914–1977)

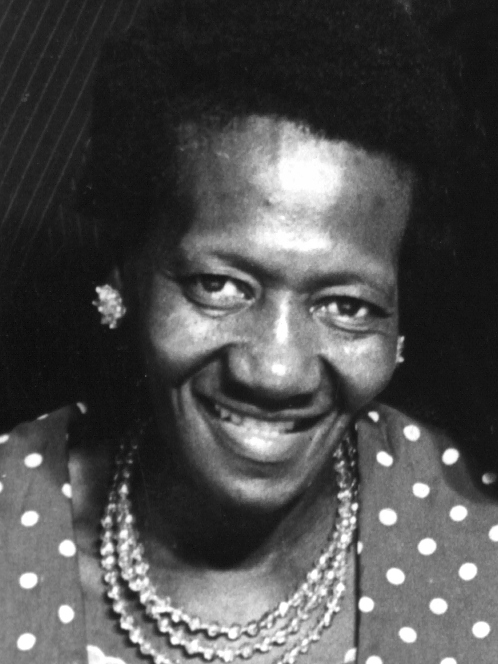
- De Jesus in 1960
- Born: 14 March 1914; Sacramento, Minas Gerais, Brazil
- Died: 13 February 1977 (aged 62); São Paulo, Brazil
- Occupation: Memoirist
- Notable work: Quarto de Despejo, trans. Child of the Dark (US); Beyond All Pity (UK)

Carolina Maria de Jesus (14 March 1914 – 13 February 1977) was a Brazilian outskirts memoirist who lived most of her life as a slum-dweller. She is best known for her diary, published in August 1960 as Quarto de Despejo (lit. "Junk Room") after attracting the attention of a Brazilian journalist, which became a bestseller and won international acclaim. Appearing in English translation under the title Child of the Dark: The Diary of Carolina Maria de Jesus (US) or Beyond All Pity (UK), the work remains the only document published in English by a Brazilian slum-dweller of that period. De Jesus spent a significant part of her life in the Canindé [pt] favela in North São Paulo, supporting herself and three children as a scrap collector.

Quarto de despejo was an editorial success and spawned theatrical plays, musical compositions (some by de Jesus herself), illustrations and sayings, and has inspired both individual and collective artistic creations, especially by other Black women from Brazilian city outskirts. De Jesus lends her name to community preparatory schools, theatre halls, saraus and collective action groups. The 2020 edition of the Festa Literária das Periferias (Outskirts Literary Festival) was held in honour of de Jesus' memory, on the 60th anniversary of the book's publication.

== Biography ==
=== Early life ===
Carolina Maria de Jesus was born in 1914 in Sacramento, Minas Gerais, which at that time was a small rural town. Her parents were illiterate sharecroppers. She was the daughter of a single mother, and her father was married to another woman. For those reasons, she was treated as an outcast as a child and was a victim of child mistreatment. When she reached the age of seven, de Jesus' mother forced her to attend school. Maria Leite Monteiro de Barros, a wealthy landowner's wife who was also a benefactor to other poor black neighbourhood children, supported her for a while and paid for her schooling. Her formal education lasted a meagre two years, though by then she was already able to read and write. As her mother had illegitimate children, her family was excluded from Catholic Church. Nevertheless, she never stopped considering herself a Catholic. For instance, she often made biblical references and praises to God in her diary: "I dreamt I was an angel. My dress was billowing and had long pink sleeves. I went from earth to heaven. I put stars in my hands and played with them. I talked to the stars. They put on a show in my honor. They danced around me and made a luminous path. When I woke up I thought: I’m so poor. I can't afford to go to a play so God sends me these dreams for my aching soul. To the God who protects me, I send my thanks."

In 1937, the year her mother died, de Jesus migrated to the metropolis of São Paulo, which was experiencing a demographic upswing and witnessing the appearance of its first slums. Here, she worked as a maid for white families, but found that the work clashed with her independent personality. In 1948, she became pregnant. These reasons led to her dismissal by the family for which she was a maid, and she ended up needing to live in the nearby favela, Canindé. It is reported that authorities in her hometown thought her ability to read meant that she was a practitioner of witchcraft, because it was so unusual for someone like her. In São Paulo, she earned a living by collecting recyclable materials. She would purchase what little food she could afford with the earnings of her hard work. De Jesus made her own shack out of scrap plywood, cans, cardboard, or pretty much anything she could obtain. Among the materials she collected, there would be an occasional journal or notebook, as well as books, which encouraged her to start recording her day-to-day activities and write about life in the favela. It angered her neighbours that she was always writing because they were illiterate and felt uncomfortable at the thought of her writing about them. Her neighbours were jealous of her and tended to treat de Jesus and her children badly. She never considered getting married, on account of having witnessed too much domestic violence in the slums and preferring to remain an independent woman. She had three children, each from a different relationship (at least one of whom was with a wealthy white man). Unlike many fellow black women, de Jesus celebrated her race and was proud of it. To her, her skin and hair looked beautiful.

In her diary, she gives details about the daily life of favelados (the inhabitants of favelas), and bluntly describes the political and social facts which impacted their lives. She writes of how poverty and desperation can cause people of elevated moral character to abandon their principles and dishonour themselves to simply feed their families. According to her, favelados would never get the chance to save money, as any extra earnings would immediately be used to pay off debts.

== Publication of her diary ==
De Jesus' diary was published in August 1960. She had been discovered by journalist Audálio Dantas in April 1958. Dantas was covering the opening of a neighbouring city playground when, immediately after the ribbon-cuttings, a street gang stormed in and claimed the area, chasing the children away. Dantas saw de Jesus standing at the edge of the playground shouting, "If you continue mistreating these children, I'm going to put all of your names in my book!". The intruders departed. Dantas asked what she meant by "book"; she was shy at first, but took him to her shack and showed him everything she had written. He asked her for a small sample and subsequently ran it in the newspaper. However, de Jesus is known to have given interviews and made other newspaper appearances since the early 1940s.

The inspiration for the book's title came from de Jesus' believing the favela was society's junk room: 'I live in the junk room. And whatever's in there, people either set on fire, or throw in the garbage'.

De Jesus's story electrified the town and in 1960, Quarto de Despejo was released. The first edition quickly sold its 10,000 initial copies. 20,000 copies of the second edition and an additional 50,000 copies of the third edition were soon printed to meet the popular demand of the book. Though written in the simple language of a favela dweller, the book was translated into thirteen (another source says fourteen) languages and became a bestseller in North America and Europe. It was published in the United States and UK as Child of the Dark: The Diary of Carolina Maria de Jesus in 1962. The book was heavily edited by Dantas, and some critics suspected it a fraud; but the original manuscript was preserved and reprinted in full in 1999, proving not only that de Jesus wrote the book herself, but that she was a much livelier and more poetic writer than Dantas' edition seemed to suggest. Additionally, we know that while de Jesus wanted to publish more of her own stories and poems, Dantas heavily advised her against doing so.

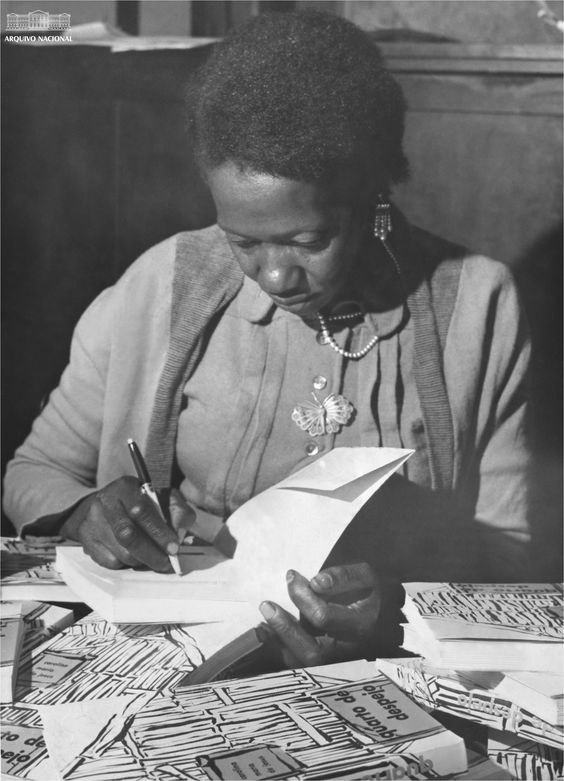
De Jesus signing a copy of Quarto de Despejo in 1960

The book's status as a bestseller came as a surprise to her neighbourhood as well as the country. Many of de Jesus's neighbours knew about her writings before the publication and would tease and ridicule her because of them. Despite the large amount of publicity and popularity caused by the diary, de Jesus continued to be a social pariah.

De Jesus' diary detailed the grim reality of her life as well as that of those around her. She judged her neighbours based on their lifestyles, using actual names and circumstances in the book. "You wrote bad things about me, you did worse than I did", a drunken neighbour once yelled. Many neighbours despised de Jesus because she seemed to look down on slum people's way of life. One man "screamed at her that she was a 'black whore' who had become rich by writing about favelados but refused to share any of her money with them." In addition to their cruel words, people threw stones and full chamber pots at her and her children. They were also angry because she used the proceeds of her diary to move into a brick-house in the high-end neighbourhood of Santana. "They swarmed around the truck and wouldn't let her leave. 'You think you are high class now, don't you'", they would scream. They despised her for what they saw as a disparagement of their way of life, even though a major achievement of her diary was to increase awareness about Brazilian favelas the world over.

When I die I don't want to be reborn
It is horrible, to put up with humanity

That has a noble appearance
That covers up its terrible qualities

I noted that humanity
Is perverse, is tyrannical

Self-seeking egoists
Who handle things politely

But all is hypocrisy
They are uncultured, and tricksters.

— Carolina Maria de Jesus, "Humanidade", Meu Estranho Diário

Seeing as de Jesus raised concerns about conditions in the favelas, local politicians started wanting to meet with her to discuss possible ways to amend the situation. São Paulo's governor Francisco Prestes Maia made a move to engage state agencies in providing poverty relief for favelados. Most of his projects were concerned with teaching women to sew, care properly for their children and practice good hygiene. However, these initiatives quickly faded.

== Children ==
De Jesus' had three children: João José, José (aka Zé) Carlos, and Vera Eunice.

Through interviews for The Life and Death of Maria de Jesus (see below § Further reading), second eldest Zé and daughter Vera provide information about her personality. Vera describes her mother's devotion to her dream of becoming a writer, without any help from others. Vera remembers her mother as strong-willed and sometimes erratic, but also states: "There is no one in the world I admire more than her."

Vera recalls that she and her brother spent most of their time at home as De Jesus rarely let her children leave their shack due to violence in the favela. Leaving her children alone at night was too dangerous. Vera also remembers that de Jesus had many romantic relationships, and that others in Canindé were sometumes hostile toward her writing: "In the favela, they thought that she was crazy, walking with her notebook under her arm. There were people who laughed. The worst ones laughed at her piles of paper, but they stopped when they realized that it was neither a joke nor craziness". When someone upset her, she threatened to write about them in her book.

According to Vera, before the publication of Quarto de despejo her mother became obsessed with Audálio Dantas, her publisher, and was constantly anxious about him sending word about her diary. Vera said her mother aspired to become a singer and an actress, but her publisher argued that this would bring her no benefit and she should continue writing books.

It estimated that de Jesus made ₢$2,000 by selling her author's rights, as compared to a 20 cruzeiros income from collecting. The family moved from the favela to a large brick house in Santana, where the children experienced discrimination from their wealthy neighbors. Other children in the neighborhood were not allowed to play with Vera and her brothers as their families considered de Jesus was "marked by the favela". De Jesus purportedly struggled with her newfound fame, wealth, and lack of privacy. Eventually she moved her family to a small ranch in Parelheiros, where she grew crops, took care of the household, and tended to João as his health grew ill. The family was prevented from getting medical help for him from public health services at the time as they did not have a work card, which was required by the social security agency.

De Jesus' new fame was brief. Without a source of income, she eventually was forced to move back to the favela. João died of kidney failure only four months after his mother had died from respiratory failure in 1977. At the time of the interview, Vera worked as a teacher and was studying to become an English-language translator, while José Carlos had alcohol use disorder and was occasionally homeless.

== Perspective ==
One of the characteristics differentiating Carolina Maria de Jesus from her neighbours in the Canindé favela was her distinctive perspective on life. Though living among the lowest classes of society, de Jesus had dreams and aspirations not unlike those of any privileged person who enjoyed a comfortable living in Brazil during the mid-1900s. De Jesus believed that her dreams could be realized and, against great odds, many of them were. She stood by a different paradigm than her favelado counterparts, and lived accordingly.

At no point in de Jesus's life was she at peace with the fact that she was born into the lower classes. The activities she occupied her spare time with, her decision to avoid the many risks of a vulnerable life as well as her affairs, all indicated that while she was physically in the favela, her mind wandered free. "[W]hat set Carolina apart in Canindé was her penchant for spending several hours a day writing". In an environment with high illiteracy rates, eloquent writing was a particularly rare accomplishment. She wrote poems, novels and stories. In the early 1940s, de Jesus began taking her work to editors in an attempt to get it published. She persevered until in 1960, Dantas decided to publish her diary.

Among the many things de Jesus chose to write about in her diary were the people living around her. She describes herself as being very different from fellow favelados, and claimed that "she detested other blacks from her social class". While she watched many of the people around her succumb to drugs, alcohol, prostitution, violence, and robbery, she strived to stay loyal to her children and her writing. De Jesus was consistently able to provide for her children by recycling scrap material for money or diving through dumpsters for food and clothing. By saving some of the paper she collected, de Jesus had the material she needed to go on with her writing.

De Jesus offers a non-academic perspective on poverty and exclusionary economic expansion in Brazil, which was then rarely made by someone who did not come from the educated classes. The moment is particularly ironic, as it was a time when Brasília, the symbol of a 'New Brasil', had just been inaugurated.

Another atypical part of de Jesus' life concerned romantic affairs. Although it was not unusual for Black women at the time to seek light-skinned partners, since lighter skin was openly associated with higher economic status due to white systemic racism and anti-Blackness, de Jesus did not want to leverage relationships in order to improve her own situation. Her children were fathered by white foreigners from Italy, Portugal, and the United States. A few romantic partners offered to marry her, yet she accepted none of their proposals, even though by marrying them, she would have been lifted out of poverty. A possible explanation for that may be that she did not want anyone dictating how she lived. Regardless of the reason, de Jesus remained true to her beliefs and did not conform to the way of life of the favela.

== Global impact ==
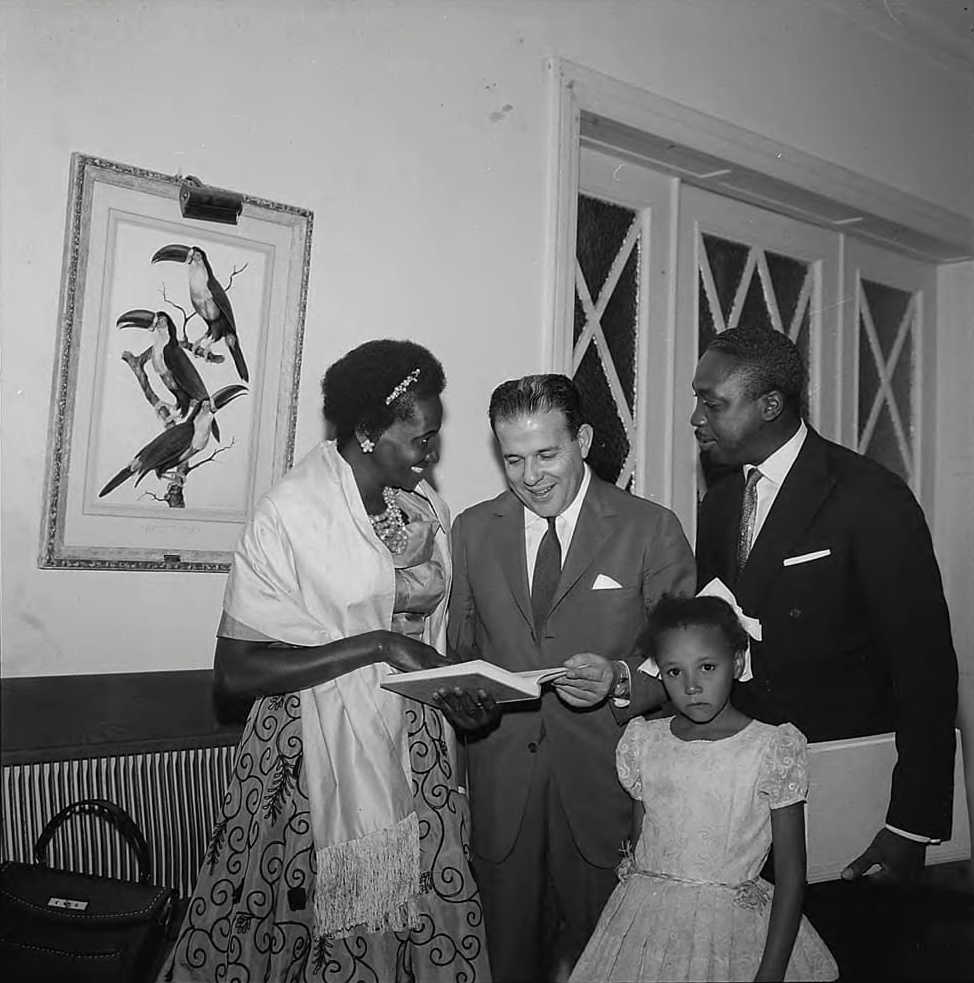
De Jesus with Brazilian President João Goulart

Carolina Maria de Jesus had a great cultural impact on Brazil. Her decision to write about the struggles of the community versus strictly about her own struggles was something unprecedented in Brazil and was a perspective that was appreciated internationally

De Jesus wrote another four books after Quarto de despejo, to a scanty success. She rose to fame and fell from grace very rapidly. This could be because of her strong personality, which kept her from getting along with people very well. Also, the Brazilian political landscape changed drastically after the 1964 Brazilian coup d'état, which left little room for freedom of expression. She still wrote poems, short stories, and brief memoirs, none of which were ever published. In fact, her obituary in a 1977 edition of the Jornal do Brasil speaks of her blaming herself for not being able to take advantage of her brief celebrity status and states that her stubbornness led her to die in poverty. Still, her biography and memoirs provide insight into Brazilian favela life. While her life story can be seen as a struggle with tragedy, it is possible to regard her views as common Brazilian attitudes towards society, family life, equality, poverty, and other aspects of daily existence in the 1960s.

Her book was read extensively both in capitalist areas such as Western Europe and the United States, as well as in the Eastern Bloc and Cuba, the wide range of the audience demonstrating how many people were affected by her story outside of Brazil. For the liberal capitalist West, the book portrayed a cruel and corrupt system which had been reinforced by centuries of colonial ideals they also shared. By contrast, for communist readers the stories depicted perfectly the fundamental flaws of capitalist production in which the worker is the most downtrodden part of the economic system.

As Brazilian historian José Carlos Sebe Bom Meihy noted, "many foreign specialists in Brazil year after year used her translated diary in their classes", which indicates her worldwide role in providing an uncommon first-hand account of 1960s favela life. According to Robert M. Levine, "Carolina's words brought alive a slice of Latin American reality rarely acknowledged in traditional textbooks."

A biography about her was written by author Jarid Arraes as part of her 2015 cordel collection and book Heroínas Negras Brasileiras em 15 cordéis.

On 14 March 2019, search engine Google commemorated de Jesus with a Doodle on the 105th anniversary of her birth.

== Bibliography ==
- Quarto de Despejo: Diário de uma favelada (1960). Translated by David St. Clair as Child of the Dark: The Diary of Carolina Maria de Jesus. New York: E. P. Dutton, 1962. As Beyond All Pity, London, UK: Souvenir Press, 1962; Panther, 1970; Earthscan, 1990. Extracted in Daughters of Africa, edited by Margaret Busby, 1992.
- Casa de alvenaria (1961)
- Pedaços de fome (1963)
- Provérbios (1963)
- Diário de Bitita (1982, posthumous)
- Meu estranho diário (1996, posthumous)
- Onde estaes felicidade? (2014, posthumous)
