= Tereza de Benguela =

18th century Brazilian leader

Tereza de Benguela (Benguela - Cuiabá, 25 July 1770) was a quilombola leader who lived in the state of Mato Grosso, in Brazil, during the 18th century. She is notable for her leadership of the Quilombo do Piolho.

== Life ==
She was married to José Piolho, who headed the Quilombo do Piolho (or do Quariterê), between the Guaporé River (the boundary between Mato Grosso and Bolívia) and Cuiabá city. Following the death of José Piolho, Tereza became the queen of the quilombo, and, under her leadership, the black and indigenous community resisted slavery for two decades, surviving up to 1770, when the quilombo was destroyed by the forces of Luís Pinto de Sousa Coutinho. The entire population, which included 79 black and 30 indigenous people, was killed or arrested.

Queen Tereza led the political, economical and administrative structure of the quilombo, maintaining a defense system with guns traded with white people or redeemed from the nearby villages. The stolen objects used against the black community that used to take refuge there were transformed into work instruments, because they knew how to work with forge. The Quilombo do Guariterê, besides the parliament and a queen counselor, developed cotton production and owned looms where they produced fabric that was commercialized outside the quilombos. They also used to sell food.

== Legacy ==
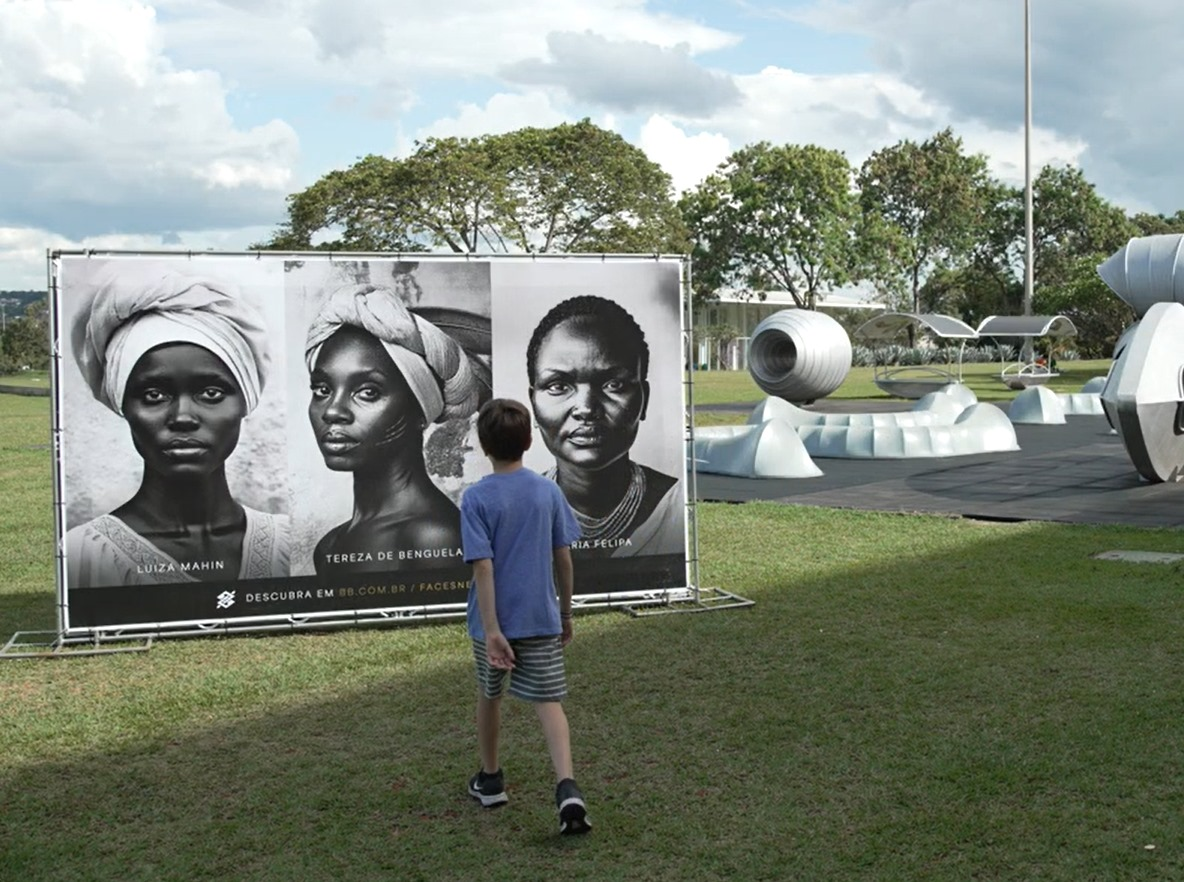
Exhibition of AI-created art of Tereza de Benguela, Luiza Mahin, and Maria Felipa - Faces Negras Importam - at the Centro Cultural Banco do Brasil

In 2014, July 25 was designated the National Day of Tereza de Benguela and the Black Woman.

A biography about her was written by author Jarid Arraes as part of her 2015 cordel collection and book Heroínas Negras Brasileiras em 15 cordéis.
