= Zacimba Gaba =

Angolan princess

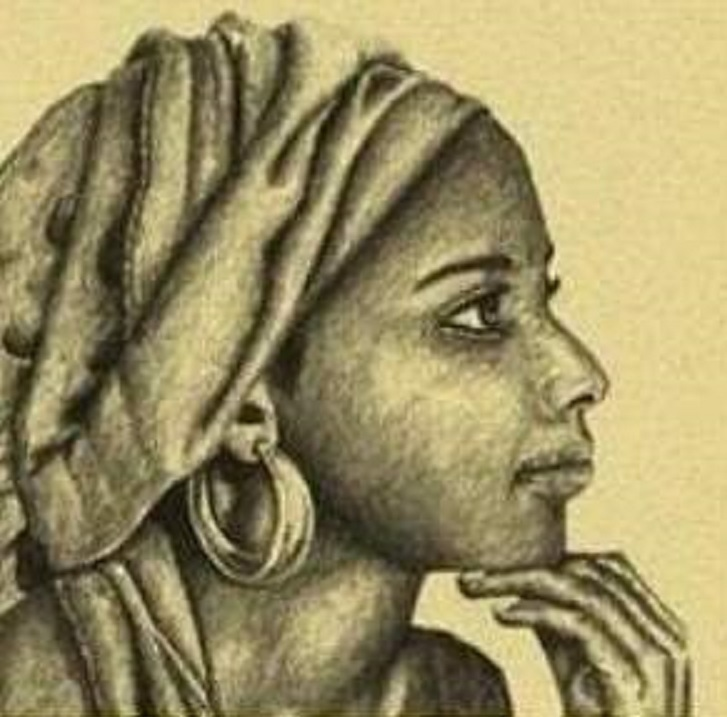
- Born: Cabinda

Zacimba Gaba (fl. 17th century) was a princess from the Cabinda region of the Kingdom of Kongo, in modern-day Angola, who was forced into slavery and taken to Brazil in 1690. She was taken to the Fazenda José Trancoso plantation in what is now the state of Espírito Santo. She suffered from torture and rape at the hands of the plantation owner, José Trancoso, whom she eventually poisoned and led a mass fleeing of enslaved people from. She established a quilombo settlement on the outskirts of Riacho Doce beach, in what is now the municipality of Conceição da Barra, near the village of Itaúnas. Afterwards, she began building canoes and organizing nighttime attacks on the port near the village of São Mateus, freeing recently arrived enslaved Black people.

== Biography ==
Zacimba, who was a warrior princess from the Cabinda region, was kidnapped and forced to the Porto da Aldeia in São Mateus in 1690, in the north of the captaincy of Espírito Santo. Upon arriving there, she was sold into slavery to Portuguese plantation owner José Trancoso. She was tortured and raped until she had revealed that she had been royalty in her homeland. However, she forbade her fellow enslaved people from helping to free her until she was able to poison her enslavers. Over the span of years, she had slowly poisoned Trancoso with a powder she had made from the crushed head of the highly venomous jararaca, what she had dubbed the "pó de amassar sinhô". When Trancoso eventually died from poisoning, she ordered an invasion of the casa-grande to free the enslaved people in the slave quarters. All the torturers were killed, but Trancoso's family had been spared. Before fleeing the plantation, Zacimba guided her fellow enslaved people away from the plantation, waging war against the foremen.

After fleeing, she established her quilombo settlement on the outskirts of the Riacho Doce in what is now the municipality of Conceição da Barra. This quilombo was the first that there is record of in the Sapê do Norte region. Around the area, there came to be the creation of various communities made up of the quilombo's descendants, dubbed quilombolas, who have fought to have definitive possession over their land. The princess spent the rest of her life leading armies to the port near São Mateus to free forcibly enslaved Black people who had recently arrived from Africa, and fighting to destroy slave ships.

=== Legacy ===
A biography about her was written by author Jarid Arraes as part of her 2015 cordel collection and book Heroínas Negras Brasileiras em 15 cordéis. In the biography, she writes:

"Quando Zacimba chegou
E então foi interrogada
Respondeu com altivez
Fez a história confirmada
Era sim uma princesa
Por seu povo era adorada..."

In a brief passage, Arraes makes mention of her nighttime raids to free enslaved people from the slave ships, highlighting the relevance of the Angolan princess to current struggles against racism and misogyny.

== Read more ==
- AGUIAR, M. (2007). História dos Quilombolas. São Mateus, ES: Memorial.
- Dalton Paula, (2020). Zacimba Gaba.
