= Antonieta de Barros =

Brazilian teacher, journalist and politician

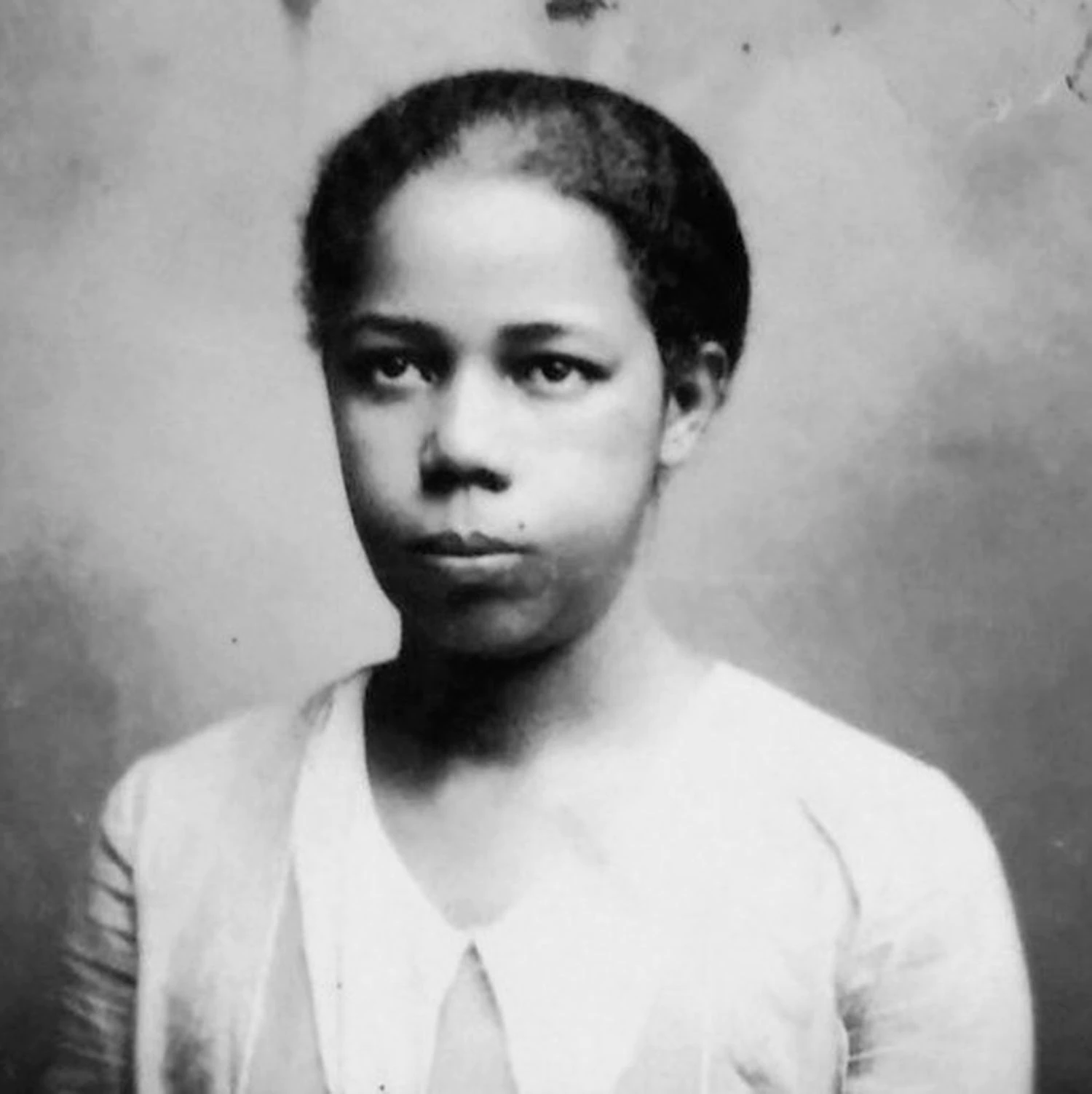
- Born: July 11, 1901; Florianópolis, Santa Catarina, Brazil
- Died: March 28, 1952 (aged 50); Florianópolis, Santa Catarina, Brazil
- Occupations: Journalist, politician

Antonieta de Barros (July 11, 1901 – March 28, 1952) was a Brazilian journalist and politician.

== Life and career ==
Born in the Brazilian state of Santa Catarina on July 11, 1901, Antonieta de Barros was a pioneer in fighting the discrimination against blacks and women. She was elected to the Legislative Assembly of Santa Catarina in 1935 as the first black female state deputy in the country and the first woman deputy in her state. Antonieta was a professor, journalist and writer, remembered most for her ability to express her ideas within a historical context which did not permit a woman's freedom of expression.

In addition to political militancy, Antonieta actively participated in the cultural life of her state. She founded and directed the journal "A Semana" between the years of 1922 and 1927. During this period, through her chronicles, she circulated her ideas, principally those linked to questions of education, oppressive policies, the feminine condition, and racial prejudice. She also directed a biweekly magazine "Vida Ilhoa" in 1930, and wrote various articles for local journals. In 1937, under the pseudonym Maria da Ilha, she wrote her book Farrap, os de Ideias (Farrap, those of Ideas)

She was a deputy of the Santa Catarina Legislative Assembly in the 1ª legislatura (1935–1937) (List of the state deputies of the Santa Catarina 1st Legislature), aligned with the Partido Liberal Catarinense (PLC) (the Catarinense liberal Party). She was state deputy in the 1ª legislatura (1947–1951) (List of the state deputies of Santa Catarina), called as an alternate, affiliated with the Partido Social Democrático (PSD) (the Social Democratic Party).

== Legacy ==
The Legislative Assembly of Santa Catarina annually awards the "Medalha Antonieta de Barros" (The Antonieta de Barros Medal) to women with relevant service in defense of Catarinense women's rights. The túnel da Via Expressa Sul, in Florianópolis, was given her name. A biography about her was written by author Jarid Arraes as part of her 2015 cordel collection and book Heroínas Negras Brasileiras em 15 cordéis.

== Publications ==
- Piazza, Walter: Dicionário Político Catarinense (Catarinense Political Dictionary). Florianópolis: Assembleia Legislativa do Estado de Santa Catarina (The Santa Catarina State Legislative Assembly), 1985.
