= Jarid Arraes =

Brazilian writer

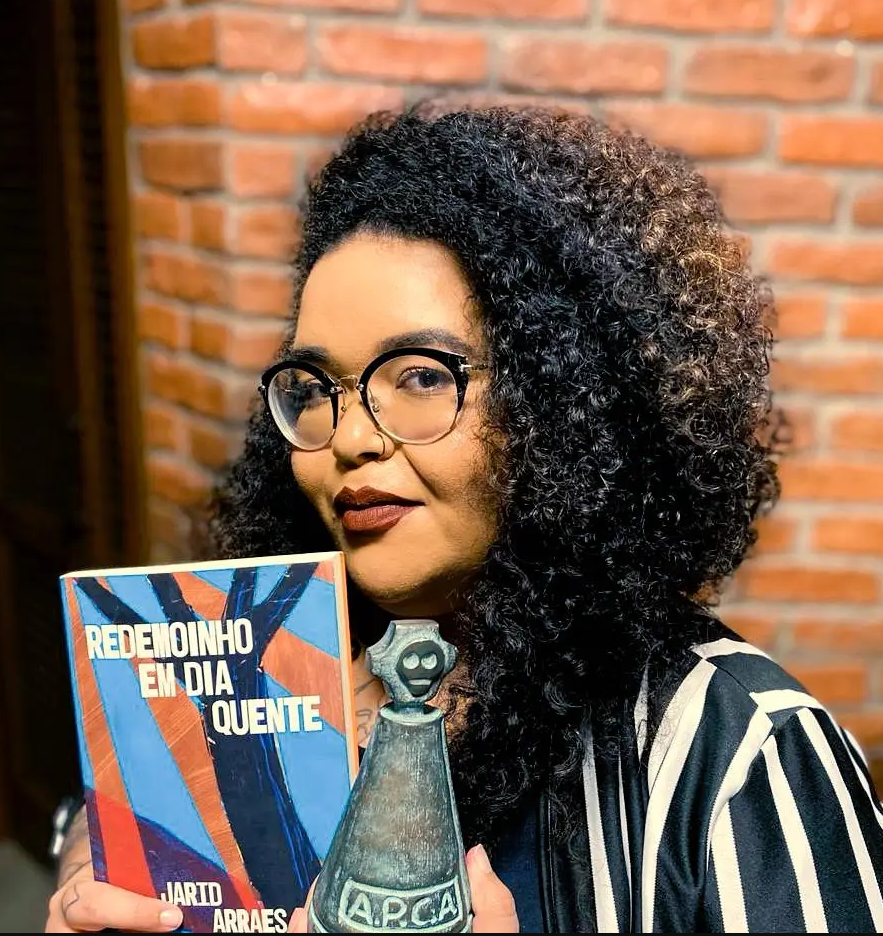
- Arraes with her APCA Literature 2019 trophy
- Born: 12 February 1991 (age 35); Juazeiro do Norte, Ceará, Brazil
- Occupations: Poet, writer
- Years active: 2011–present
- Notable work: As Lendas de Dandara; Heroínas Negras Brasileiras em 15 cordéis Um buraco com meu nome Redemoinho em dia quente

Jarid Arraes (born 12 February 1991, Juazeiro do Norte) is a Brazilian poet and writer. She is the writer of such books as As Lendas de Dandara, Heroínas Negras Brasileiras em 15 cordéis, Um buraco com meu nome, and Redemoinho em dia quente. Arraes lives in São Paulo, where she created the Women's Writing Club (Portuguese: Clube da Escrita Para Mulheres). To date, she has more than 70 publications in the cordel literature style, including the biographical collection Heroínas Negras na História do Brasil.

== Early life ==
Arraes was born in 1991 in Juazeiro do Norte, Ceará. During her childhood, Arraes grew up with a strong connection to literature, being most acutely influenced by family. She is a descendent of Mestre Noza, considered one of the city's greatest artists and a pioneer in cordel literature. Her grandfather, Abraão Batista, was a poet, woodcutter, sculptor, ceramist, engraver, and teacher. From the end of the 1960s, he had also produced more than 200 works of cordel literature. With international recognition, he was also one of the founders of the Brazilian Academy of Cordel Literature in Rio de Janeiro. He founded the Centro de Cultura Mestre Noza and the Associação dos Artesãos do Padre Cícero, with the objective of coalescing the artists of Juazeiro do Norte for the organizing and valorizing the activity of the city's artisans. Arraes' father, Hamurabi Batista, is a popular poet, cordel writer, woodcutter and sculptor. With a vast collection of more than 250 packets, he brings in his works a strong commitment to history and political struggle involving historical personalities and various racial issues. He works with the Centro de Cultura Mestre Noza and the Associação dos Artesãos do Padre Cícero, where he is the director of the latter.

Jarid grew up with depictions of traditional Northeastern culture going to the Centro de Cultura Popular Mestre Noza. Along with cordel literature, her influences also include authors such as Carlos Drummond de Andrade, Paulo Leminski, Manuel Bandeira and Ferreira Gullar. As she was growing up, however, it became clear to her that access to works of literature could be precarious, and thus this motivated her to research and learn about women that made history not just as authors and poets, but from a wide range of fields, principally black women, whom she realized were not highlighted and covered in schools and the media.

== Career ==
=== Beginning of literary career: 2011–2015 ===
In 2011, at the age of 20, Arraes began to publish her works on the blog Mulher Dialética. Soon she began to collaborate with blogs like Blogueiras feministas and Blogueiras Negras. Two years later, she became a columnist for Revista Fórum, where she wrote the blog Questão de Gênero until February 2016. At Revista Fórum, she also worked as a journalist and wrote materials about issues related to human rights, such as feminism, anti-racism movements, LGBTQ rights, among others.

Arraes lived in Juazeiro do Norte until 2014, and in that year participated in collectives around the region such as Pretas Simoa (Grupo de Mulheres Negras do Cariri) and FEMICA (Feministas do Cariri), which she helped establish. In 2014, she moved to São Paulo, where she came to be part of the NGO Casa de Lua until it closed. In 2015, she created the free project Clube da Escrita Para Mulheres, creating periodic meetings with the objective of encouraging women who write or who want to start writing. In 2017, the club became a larger collective of members and writers.

In July 2015, Arraes published As Lendas de Dandara, her first prose book that in one edition had illustrations by Aline Valek. In less than a year, the book was completely sold out and it was republished in December 2016 by Editora de Cultura. The book was born out of the necessity to reclaim the story of Dandara dos Palmares, known as the wife of Zumbi dos Palmares, and had the potential to mix legend and fantasy with the history of the quilombola struggle against slavery in Brazil. She has also made kids' books in the cordel style, such as "A menina que não queria ser princesa", "A bailarina gorda", and "Os cachinhos encantados da princesa".

In June of that year, Arraes launched the cordel collection and book Heroínas Negras Brasileiras em 15 cordéis with Pólen Livros, with biographies written in cordel style and features prominent Black Brazilian women such as Antonieta de Barros, Aqualtune, Carolina Maria de Jesus, Dandara dos Palmares, Esperança Garcia, Eva Maria Bonsucesso, Laudelina de Campos Melo, Luísa Mahin, Maria Filipa de Oliveira, Maria Firmina dos Reis, Mariana Crioula, Na Agontimé, Tereza de Benguela, Tia Ciata, and Zacimba Gaba. The book is in its third edition being published by Companhia das Letras. She hosted several book launch events in São Paulo and Rio de Janeiro. The book posted record sales and completely sold out copies.

=== Continued success: 2016–present ===
In July 2018, she launched her first book of poems, Um buraco com meu nome, published by Ferina, with which she became a curator. She also drew the illustrations in the book. The book was first presented at the Festa Literária Internacional de Paraty (FLIP) that year. The label Ferina, part of Pólen, was launched in 2018 with the purpose of publishing Brazilian women authors and has been noted for their diverse range of authors, including Black, Indigenous, and transgender authors. These include, Jaqueline Jesus, Márcia Wayna Kambeba, Cidinha da Silva, and Heloísa Teixeira.

In October 2018, Arraes' book As Lendas de Dandara was translated into French and released in France by publisher Anacaona under the title Dandara et les esclaves libre. She had a launch tour in French cities and participated in events in Paris, at the Maison de l'Amérique latine, as well as in Rennes, in La Rochelle at the Musée du Nouveau Monde, and in Lille, at the Le Bateau, along with having visited various schools and universities. In July 2019, she launched her first book of tales through the publisher Alfaguara (Companhia das Letras), Redemoinho em dia quente, in which she introspects on her Cariri ancestry. The first launched occurred during that year's FLIP, of which she was an invited guest. The book was award Best Book of Tales and Chronicles of 2019 by the Associação Paulista de Críticos de Arte (APCA). She has been awarded other honors, including the Biblioteca Nacional prize and the Suplento Pernambuco prize for her works.

While at FLIP in 2019, Arraes participated in the "Vila Nova da Rainha" panel with Cuban-American writer Carmen Maria Machado and was mediated by journalist Adriana Couto, as well as the "Livro da cabeceira" panel, the panel that traditionally closes off the festival. Two books of hers were among the most bought at FLIP: Heroínas Negras Brasileiras em 15 cordéis and Redemoinho em dia quente. For her appearance there, she was on the front cover of the culture subcolumn of Estadão, interviewed by Folha de S.Paulo and had her works reviewed on websites such as Marie Claire, Claudia and Vogue Brasil, naming her one of the most important names currently in Brazilian literature.

Arraes also had launch events for Redemoinho em dia quente in Rio de Janeiro and in São Paulo. In Rio, she talked with mediators from the Leia Mulheres Rio de Janeiro at the Travessa Botafogo bookstore; in São Paulo, she had a chat with writer Marcelino Freire at the Centro Cultural São Paulo, along with a photographic exhibition with photos made for the author herself. They were taken in Juazeiro do Norte and in Crato, both in the Cariri region, the area where she grew up and where also the tales from Redemoinho em dia quente took place. The exhibition occurred with the curation by photographer Maria Ribeiro, who also edited the photos. The first 50 people that bought Redemoinho em dia quente at the launch event won a rare copy of a piece of cordel literature by Arraes herself. The piece cointained two stories: the first being a complete version of cordel that was part of the regular book, "Asa no pé", and a second one based loosely on the works of Jean-Paul Sartre, titled "Patas vazias".

Arraes has collaborated with a diverse range of websites and magazines, among them Folha de S.Paulo, the magazine Quatro Cinco Um, Caros Amigos, Claudia, Cult and Blooks. She has also had poems published in Revista Parênteses and Revista Gueto, participated in the anthology of poems TAG Experiências Literárias, wrote the cordel Chega de Fiu Fiu in partnership with the NGO Think Olga and the work "Informação Contra o Machismo" in an awarded partnership with Artigo 19. In 2020, she was listed by Forbes as one of their 30 Under 30 personalities from Brazil, with the premiere of their edition of the UNDER-30 that gives emphasis to younger professionals who have made a difference in their country.

=== Style ===
Arraes, from early on, had a strong connection with literature, influenced by her grandfather Abraão Batista and father Hamurabi Batista. Her influences from working with cordel have gone on to inspire works outside of poetry, such as tales and romance novels. She has also participated in poem collections with other artists, magazine publishers, and editions and revisions of previous works. She has also written prefaces, afterwords, and others.

She has published more than 70 titles in the style of cordel. Such of them were published in book format, such as with Heroínas negras em 15 cordéis (1st edition - 2017 - Pólen Livros; second edition - 2020 - Seguinte) and Cordéis para crianças incríveis (1st edition - 2024 - Companhia das Letrinhas).

== Legacy ==
On 12 October 2017, actress and singer Thalma de Freitas premiered a musical about Heroínas Negras Brasileiras em 15 cordéis at Jazz nos Fundos in São Paulo.

== Bibliography ==
- As Lendas de Dandara (Prose). Editora de Cultura, 2016.
- Heroínas negras brasileiras em 15 cordéis (Cordel). Polén Livros, 2017.
- Um buraco com meu nome (Poems), Selo Ferina, 2018.
- Dandara et les esclaves libres (French edition of As lendas de Dandara) (Prose). Anacaona, 2018.
- Redemoinho em dia quente (Short Stories). Alfaguara, 2019.
- Heroínas negras brasileiras em 15 cordéis (2nd ed.) (Cordel). Seguinte, 2020.
- Um buraco com meu nome (2nd ed.) (Poems). Alfaguara, 2021.
- Corpo desfeito (Novel). Alfaguera, 2022.
- Cordéis para crianças incríveis (Cordel). Companhia das Letrinhas, 2024.
