= Laudelina de Campos Melo =

- Born: 12 October 1904; Poços de Caldas, Minas Gerais, Brazil
- Died: 12 May 1991 (aged 86); Campinas, São Paulo, Brazil
- Other names: Laudelina Campos de Mello, Laudelina Campos Mello, Nina Campos de Mello
- Occupations: domestic worker, activist
- Years active: 1916–1988
- Known for: Organizing unions for domestic workers

Laudelina de Campos Melo (12 October 1904 – 12 May 1991) was an Afro-Brazilian activist, labor organizer and community worker. A domestic worker for most of her life, she recognized early in life the discrimination against and undervaluation of working women. Throughout her life, she strove to change public perception and policy vis-à-vis domestic workers, and was successful in establishing organizations for domestic workers to lobby for being recognized as a class of workers entitled to labor rights.

== Early life ==
Laudelina de Campos Melo was born on 12 October 1904 in Poços de Caldas, Minas Gerais, Brazil to Sidônia and Marco Aurélio. Her mother was a domestic worker and her father worked as a lumberjack. Both parents had been born to slaves, but under the terms of the Rio Branco Law, which passed in 1871, they were granted their freedom at birth, though their parents remained in bondage. At age 12, when her father was killed in a tree-felling accident, Melo quit school to care for her five younger siblings so that her mother could work full time in a hotel.

Interested in improving her community, from the time she was a teenager, Melo worked in various black cultural organizations. In 1920, she was elected president of a cultural group, Clube 13 de Maio, which focused on political activism and recreational activities. While still in her teens, she began working as a domestic for Julia Kubitschek. Kubitschek's son Juscelino would become president of Brazil in the mid-1950s and Melo lived and worked in the household even after they moved to São Paulo.

== Activism ==
In 1924, Melo married a stone mason, Henrique Geremias, who was from Rio de Janeiro. She became politically active, joining the Communist Party of Brazil, the Frente Negra Brasileira (Black Brazilian Front), and the black cultural organization Saudades de Campinas. They remained in São Paulo, where their two children were born, until 1932, when they relocated to Santos. There, Melo's activism focused on reducing racial prejudice and undervaluing the labor of working women. Around 1936, she founded the Associação Beneficente das Domésticas de Santos (Santos Domestic Laborers' Association). By uniting workers in the organization, she hoped it would be a platform to improve their education on legal issues effecting them, as well as a vehicle to build a shared awareness and solidarity among women domestic workers to fight for their rights.

She continued to press for the rights of domestic workers until social organizations were banned by the dictatorship of President Getúlio Vargas. When Vargas was deposed by a coup d'état, in 1946, she resumed the activity of the domestic association as its president. Working as a nanny, in the late 1940s, Melo moved with the family of her employment to Mogi das Cruzes, where she managed a farmhouse/hotel until her employer died. Returning in 1954 or 1955 to Campinas, Melo opened a boarding house and left domestic work behind. She sold snacks at the Guarani and Ponte Preta football stadiums to supplement her income and redoubled her work in cultural and trade activism. Active in the Black Movement of Brazil, she participated in the Teatro Experimental do Negro (Black Experimental Theater) group, which aimed at providing confidence-boosting cultural activities through dance and theatrical performance to black youth. To facilitate access to training, Melo founded a dance and music school in Campinas.

In 1961, Melo founded the Associação dos Empregados Domésticos de Campinas (Association of Campinas' Domestic Laborers) to support literacy training and unionize domestic workers. She partnered with politicians like Francisco Amaral and with the progressive wing of the Catholic Church to continue pressing for the rights of domestic workers. However, she left the Association in 1968 due to conflicts within it. In 1972, domestic workers were granted the right to Social Security and yearly paid holidays.

In 1982, Melo was called back to the Association of Domestic Workers. She helped restructure the association into an official union in 1988, under the new name of the Sindicato dos Trabalhadores Domésticos de Campinas (Union of Domestic Workers).

== Death and legacy ==
Melo died on 22 May 1991 in Campinas and donated her home to be used as the headquarters of the Sindicato dos Trabalhadores Domésticos. She is recognized as the founder of the first domestic workers' union in Brazil and a pioneer in bringing awareness to and rights protections for domestic workers in the country. Her work led to the development of similar organizations in other states and was pivotal to the recognition of domestic workers earning the right to be classed as laborers and have protected benefits.

=== Tribute ===
A biography about her was written by author Jarid Arraes as part of her 2015 cordel collection and book Heroínas Negras Brasileiras em 15 cordéis.

On October 12, 2020, Google celebrated her 116th birthday with a Google Doodle.
