= Higher Education Institute of Brasília =

Brazilian academic institution

- Instituto de Educação Superior de Brasília
- Former name: Centro Universitário IESB
- Established: 13 April 1998
- President: Edson Machado de Sousa Filho
- Students: 25,000
- Location: Brasília, Brazil
- Website: http://www.iesb.br/

The Higher Education Institute of Brasília (IESB) is located in Brasília, the capital of Brazil. Today, the university counts about 25,000 students at the undergraduate and postgraduate levels and technical programs spread across three campuses. A fourth campus was scheduled to open in 2014. The founder and president of the IESB is Professor Eda C. B. Machado.

== History ==
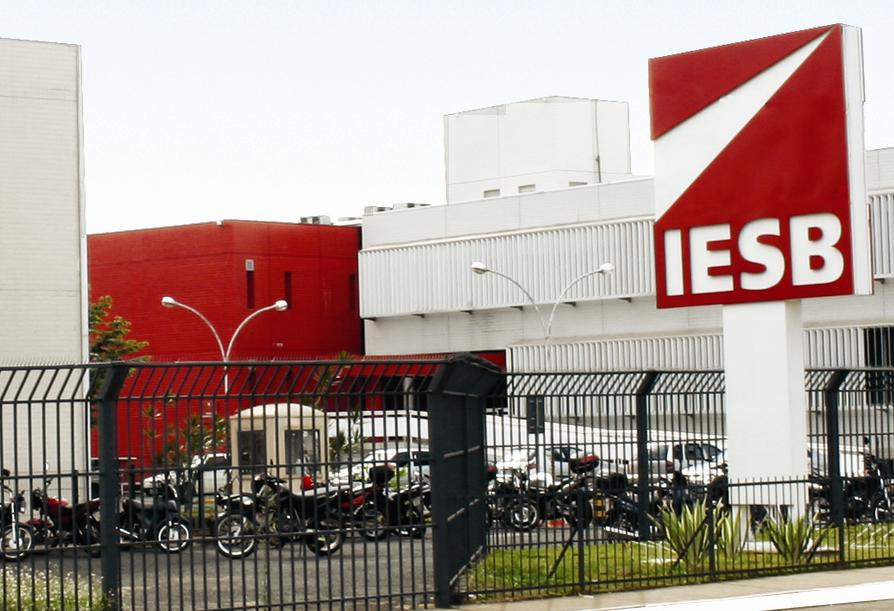
IESB

On 13 April 1998, Centro Universitàrio IESB (English: CESB, the Center of Higher Education of Brasília) was founded, aiming to be an institution that developed education, research and extension activities of a higher level. After four years, the Ministry of Education authorized the two first undergraduate courses: Education Science and Administration, with concentrations in Science and Technology Policy and Management and Human Resources. In 1998, two more courses were authorized: Legal Sciences and Social Communication, with concentrations in Journalism, Advertising and Marketing. Other courses created in 1999 and IESB moved to another campus in L2 Norte, Quadra 609. In 2013, IESB took part in Pronatec, a program of the Ministry of Education (Brazil). This way they enrolled about 3000 students for a quicker formation in technical courses.

== Eda Coutinho Institute ==
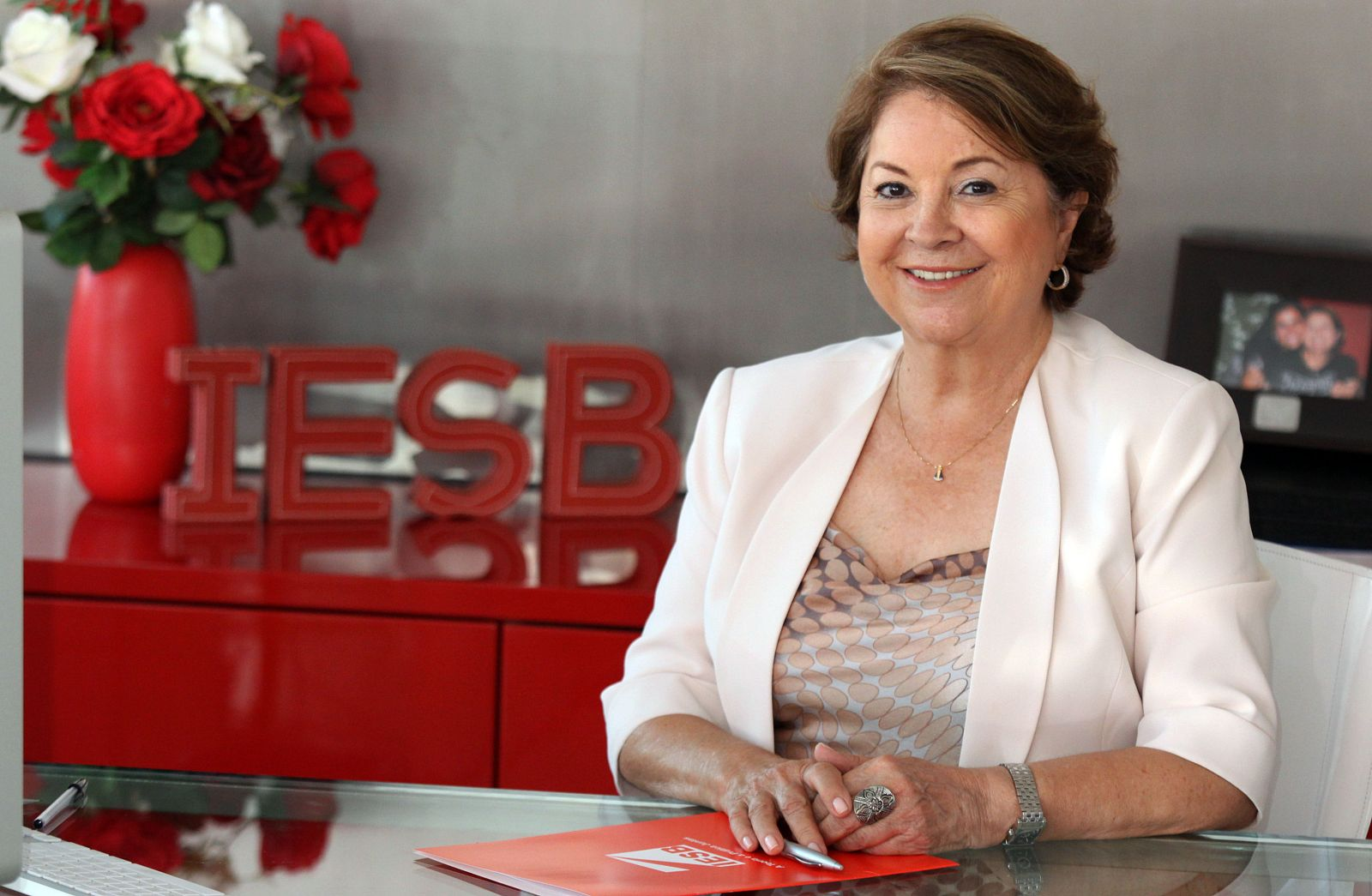
Eda C.B Machado, President of the IESB

The institute is named after the founder and former president of the IESB, Professor Eda C. B. Machado.

== Internationalization ==
IESB is working on its internationalization and already managed to have several partnerships with:

- Caucasus University (Georgia)
- Centro Tecnologico per il settore Legno e del Mobile – COSMOB (Italy)
- CETYS Universidad (Mexico)
- Culinary Arts Academy (Switzerland)
- Istituto Europeo di Design – IED (Italy)
- Instituto Politécnico de Leiria (Portugal)
- National Chung Hsing University (Taiwan)
- SIAS International University (China)
- Swiss Education Group (Switzerland)
- The Pennsylvania State University (United States)
- Universidad Autónoma de Guadalajara (Mexico)
- Universitá di Camerino (Italy)
- University of Finance and Administration (Czech Republic)
- Xihing University (China)
- Zhengzhou University of Science and Technology (China)
