= Bom Sucesso, Paraíba =

Bom Sucesso
- Municipality
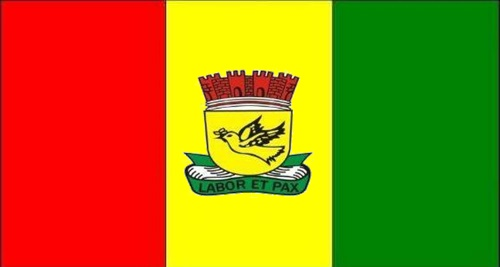
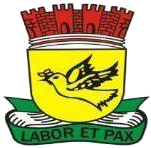
- Flag Coat of arms

- Location in Brazil
- Coordinates: 6°26′42″S 37°55′44″W
- Country: Brazil
- Region: Northeast
- State: Paraíba
- Mesoregion: Sertao Paraibana

Population (2020)
  - Total: 4,956
- Time zone: UTC−3 (BRT)

Bom Sucesso is a municipality in the state of Paraíba in the Northeast Region of Brazil.

== See also ==
- List of municipalities in Paraíba
