= Sarau (event) =

A sarau is a cultural event in which groups unite to integrate socially and culturally, usually by means of artistic expression. The word derives from the Latin seranus, becoming the Galego word serão, which refers to the fact that the events take place at night. A sarau may involve poetry, acoustic music, acting, and even art that is not performance-based, such as painting.

In the Middle Ages, the saraus were the moments when singers and troubadours presented themselves. Their popularity was consolidated in the French Court of Louis XV in the 18th century. In Brazil, they were associated with the Romanticism movement, becoming hubs for the exchange of new ideas.

Saraus are ongoing to this day in Brazilian culture.

In Portugal, a sarau is also often related to gymnastics events, in a non-competitive basis.
