= Eva Maria Bonsucesso =

Brazilian street vendor

- Born: Brazilian Empire

Eva Maria Bonsucesso (fl. 19th c.) was a Brazilian street vendor. Bonsucesso, who was a freed slave, primarily worked on Rua da Misericórdia (also known as Ladeira da Misericórdia) in Rio de Janeiro.

She became known for her work in commerce as a Black woman during the time of the Brazilian Empire. She was notable for having been successful in her efforts to jail José Inácio de Sousa, a white man, for assaulting her, at a time when the Brazilian justice system was deeply racially discriminatory against Black people.

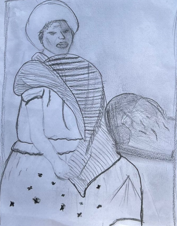
A design attributed to Eva Maria Bonsucesso made by Elaine Constâncio de Oliveira.

== Biography ==
Bonsucesso was born into slavery and lived in Rio de Janeiro in the 19th century during the Brazilian Empire. The enslavement of Black people in Brazil was legally sanctioned until 1888, with the passing of the Lei Áurea. Bonsucesso, having received her manumission letter, became a free Black woman, and would thereafter start her work as a vendor on Rua da Misericórdia.

In July 1811, her work was affected by a goat that had passed by her stand and ate a number of cabbages and a bunch of bananas. Immediately, she ran towards the goat in an attempt to retrieve her products. She would end up slapping the goat. The goat had belonged to a white man named José Inácio de Sousa, who, angered by the situation, ran to Bonsucesso and assaulted her with a slap to the face. The aggression was brought to court, where Bonsucesso was aided by various testimonies from those who were her partners at the stand. Around 30 people overall gave their testimonies that affirmed unanimously that Bonsucesso had been in the right and that the aggression came from Sousa.

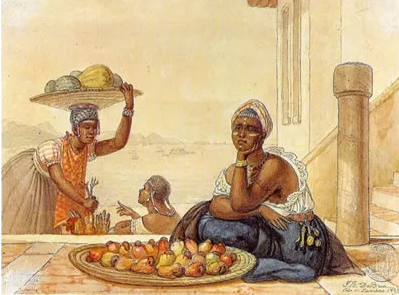
A painting by Jean-Baptiste Debret (1768–1848) which shows the commercial activities of Black Brazilian women during this time period.

== Actions by the court ==
Considering the proof, the judge sentenced Sousa to prison. Sousa, months later, had received a letter of guarantee spanning twelve months to collect proof in his favor. With this, he appealed to Dom João VI, denying that he had slapped Bonsucesso in the face, instead claiming he hit her in her back, which implied less serious harm. Sousa pointed out that the goat had worn a silver collar that belonged to the Royal Army of the Brazilian Empire, thus belonging to future emperor of Brazil Dom Pedro I. Bonsucesso was unaware of this detail, as well as the outcome of the petition sent to Dom João VI by Sousa. According to Lauriano et al (2021), it is important to mention that despite the authoritarian and violent system of slavery and its legacy in Brazil, the courts had heard the testimonies of a formerly enslaved person, and put Sousa, who had links to the Portuguese crown, behind bars. Despite the goat being royal property, that would not impede the commercial activities of Bonsucesso, who was the main vendor on Rua da Misericórdia.

== Legacy ==
A biography about her was written by author Jarid Arraes as part of her 2015 cordel collection and book Heroínas Negras Brasileiras em 15 cordéis.

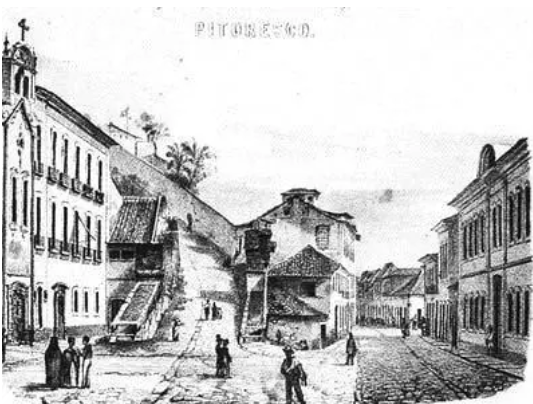
The old Ladeira da Misericórdia during the 19th century.
