= Antônio Pires Ferreira =

Brazilian farmer (1799–1877)

- Born: January 21, 1799; Santo Agostinho farm, São Bernardo (today, Magalhães de Almeida)
- Died: November 23, 1877 (aged 78); Engenho Paraíso, São Bernardo
- Occupations: Farmer, rancher
- Spouse: Lina Carlota de Jesus Rodrigues de Carvalho
- Children: 16, including Fernando
- Parents: José Pires Ferreira (father); Marianna de Deus Castro Diniz (mother)
- Family: Pires Ferreira

Antônio Pires Ferreira (1799–1877) was an important farmer from the states of Piauí and Maranhão. He built Engenho Paraíso, the most important engenho from Maranhão and household for the maranho-piauiense branch of the Pires Ferreira family.

== Biography ==
Antônio Pires Ferreira was born on 21 January 1799 on fazenda Santo Agostinho, São Bernardo (today, Magalhães de Almeida). He was the son of José Pires Ferreira with Marianna de Deus Castro Diniz, being the youngest of the four siblings.

He inherited the Santo Agostinho, Bacuri, Sambaíba, Santa Maria, Santo Inácio and Melancias farms from his father and became a farmer himself. He also incorporated the São Felipe and Capim farms to his property. He used slave labor to produce and process sugar, rice, cotton, cachaça, cassava, babaçu, carnaúba and he also had cattle.

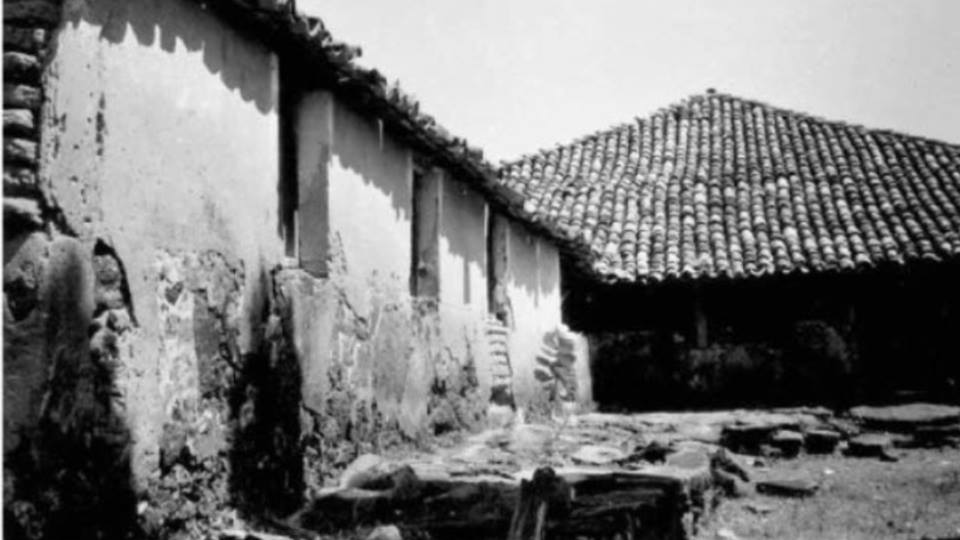
The casa-grande of the Pires Ferreira on Fazenda Paraíso

He built Engenho Paraíso at Fazenda Paraíso to pursue his economic goals. This was the most important engenho from Maranhão at a time and became the household of the piauí-maranhense branch of the Pires Ferreira family. He also built alembics and sugarcane crushers. For his slaves, he built the senzala and chapel of Saint Raymond.

He was Lieutenant Colonel of the National Guard of Tutóia. One of his functions was to be the delegate of São Bernardo Primary School. In 1858, he worked with Domingos Vieira Braga.

Antônio died on 23 November 1877 on Engenho Paraíso, São Bernardo.

== Personal life ==
Antônio married on 15 November 1825 with Lina Carlota de Jesus Rodrigues de Carvalho on Águas Claras farm, Batalha. They had 16 children: Rosa, Carolina, Manoel, Eulália, Angélica, João de Deus, Fernando, Lina, José, Columba, Maria de Deus, Manoel, Cassiana, Antônio, João de Deus and José.

== Awards and honors ==
- Commander of the Order of the Rose
