= Pires Ferreira family =

The Pires Ferreira family is a family from Brazil created in 1725 with the arrival of Domingos Pires Ferreira in Recife. The family quickly rose in importance, specially on Maranhão and Piauí regions.

The Pires Ferreira family has four main branches: the pernambucanos (from Pernambuco), maranho-piauienses (from Maranhão and Piauí), paulistas (from São Paulo) and baianos (from Bahia). Up until 2025, more than 39,000 members of Pires Ferreira family were catalogued.

== History ==
=== Colony and Empire ===
The Pires Ferreira family began in 1725, with the arrival of Domingos Pires Ferreira to Recife, Pernambuco in Colonial Brazil. He worked as a merchant and built his fortune and influence. His children were important for the Pernambucan revolt in 1817 and were active on the local politics and the third generation had important roles during the Empire of Brazil.

The Pires Ferreira family was also influential in Piauí and Maranhão. Domingos bought farms on Parnaíba to grow cattle, but the family would establish themselves for good on 1786, when José Pires Ferreira married Marianna de Deus Castro Diniz, daughter of João Paulo Diniz, pioneer of the dried meat industry in Brazil, and in 1790 moved to the farm Barra do Longá, near the Longá River. From there, their influence rose in the cities of Araioses, Magalhães de Almeida, São Bernardo, Buriti dos Lopes, Joaquim Pires, Luzilândia, Esperantina and Barras. The family worked with engenhos operated by animal traction and slave labor. They grew on power through marriage with important local families, specially the Castello Branco family.

=== Old Republic ===
During the Old Republic, the Pires Ferreira influence on Piauí continued through party politics. After the Proclamation of the Republic, Piauí politics was dominated by Antonio Coelho Rodrigues, in a political movement called "coelhismo". The Governor Coriolano de Carvalho e Silva fought with the Pires Ferreira family due his persecution of political enemies and the family lost local power. Firmino Pires Ferreira and others created an alliance known as Colligation and obligated Raimundo Arthur de Vasconcelos, the political inheritor of Coriolano, to expel Coriolano from politics, thus creating a new power structure known as Consecration. From 1896 until 1908, during Raimundo, Álvaro de Assis Osório Mendes and Areolino de Abreu Governments, Ferreira's influence on politics became predominant on Piauí. This political movement was called "piferismo".

In 1907, the Pires Ferreira family helped to elect Anísio Auto de Abreu, but he died in 1909 and Antonio Freire Silva became the new Governor. With this change, the Federal Government gained more influence in the state. Despite their initial rivalry, they united against the government of Miguel Rosa, successfully electing Eurípedes Clementino de Aguiar. From there on, the ideas of Félix Pacheco, an allied of the Pires Ferreira that was crucial to Eurípedes inauguration in the government, became predominant, what came to be known as "pachequismo". Félix then supported his brother, João Luís Ferreira in the next elections for Governor. The Pires Ferreiras wanted to elect a Governor of their own and they entered in a quarrel with Félix, but they gave up.

Pachequismo lasted for two governments, from João Luís Ferreira and Matias Olímpio de Melo. Melo's government was marked by a raise in violence in the state, as he had to fight cangaceiros and the Coluna Prestes. In 1927, the federal judge Lucrécio Dantas Avelino was murdered in his own house, and the opposition accused Melo to be the responsible, and Melo accused Eurípedes of the crime. Fernando used the instability of pachequismo and the support of the president Washington Luís, who he had family ties, to be elected as a Senator. Félix won the election, but Fernando contested on the Supreme Federal Court and was elected instead, with Félix becoming ineligible.

The structure of power change once again, and Melo was obligated to colligate with Fernando, that supported João de Deus Pires Leal as governor. When João won the elections, his government began to substitute political opponents from the public machine. João de Deus also interfered directly in the elections, when he supported the election of José Pires Ferreira Neto to the Legislative Assembly of Piauí.

=== Vargas Era ===
On 21 July 1930, Firmino died, creating a vacuum of power on Piauí politics. As his seat on the Senate was vacant, the Pires Ferreiras fought to keep someone from the family on power. They supported two candidates, Joaquim Pires Ferreira and Pires Carvalho. But the tenentists conspired together with names such as Vaz da Costa and Matias Olímpio for a victory of the Liberal Alliance on Piauí or a revolution. On 4 October, the revolucionaries successfully took power on Piauí. João de Deus was deposed and the vice-governor, Humberto de Ârea Leão, assumed. With that, the political power in the state shifted to supporters of Getúlio Vargas. Several people tied to João de Deus were fired and Matias Olímpio influence grew once again.

A process of division of goods diminished their importance. Since then, many of the Pires Ferreira members became liberal professionals. From 1940 onwards, women from the family began to work.

== Pires family ==
Between 1748 and 1756, the Portuguese Crown stimulated the immigration of 6,000 people from the Azores to Santa Catarina and Rio Grande de São Pedro to protect their lands from the Spanish interests. Amongst them, José Francisco Pires immigrated from Terceira Island to Santa Catarina Island. The Pires family from the south of the island descends from his son, Captain José Pires Ferreira.

== Notorious members of Pires Ferreira family ==
- Domingos Pires Ferreira (1718 – c. 1791): Creator of Pires Ferreira family. He built his fortune as a merchant in Recife.
- Domingos Pires Ferreira (born 1753): Priest, he militated for the liberal movement in Pernambuco during the Empire of Brazil.
- José Pires Ferreira (born 1757): Merchant and farmer, responsible for the stablishment of the family in Piauí and Maranhão.
- João de Deus Pires Ferreira (1759–1821): Political militant against Dom João VI, he was part of the Pernambucan Revolt and was arrested, dying soon after his release.
- Joaquim Pires Ferreira (born 1761): Merchant, he was part of the Pernambucan revolt and later was member of the Junta of the National Treasury of Pernambuco.
- Gervásio Pires Ferreira (1765–1836): Merchant, he was part of the Pernambucan revolt and served as President of the Provisional Junta of Pernambuco in 1821. He also served as Provincial Legislator of the Legislative Assembly of Pernambuco in 1835.
- Domingos Malaquias de Aguiar Pires Ferreira (1788–1859): Businessman, he was sent to the United States during the Pernambucan Revolt, was part of the Constituent Cortes of 1820 and served as a congressman and Vice-President of the Province of Pernambuco. He was named Baron of Cimbres by Pedro II of Brazil.
- Antônio Pires Ferreira (1799–1877): Farmer and rancher. He stablished Fazenda Paraíso, the household of the maranho-piauiense branch of the family.
- Fernando Pires Ferreira (1842–1907): Surgeon considered to be the father of ophthalmology in Brazil.
- Firmino Pires Ferreira (1848–1920): Military that served during the Paraguayan War, Revolta da Armada and the Federalist Revolution. He was also an influential Politician during the Old Republic, serving as Federal Deputy and Senator and having a huge influence on Piauí.
- Antônio de Sampaio Pires Ferreira (1853–1916): Engineer of railroads. The municipality of Pires Ferreira, Ceará, is named after him.
- Fileto Pires Ferreira (1866–1917): Politician and military officer, governor of Amazonas from 1896 to 1898. He participated in the Proclamation of the Republic in 1889. The Amazon Theatre was inaugurated during his administration on December 31, 1896.
- Júlio Pires Ferreira Sobrinho (1868–1930): Lawyer, Portuguese professor and philologist.
- Jorge Dória, pen name of Jorge Pires Ferreira (1920–2013): Actor and humorist.
- Edgardo Pires Ferreira (born in 1937): Archeologist, sociologist and museologist known for his contributions to the Museum of Archeology and Ethnology of the University of São Paulo. He is also known for working on the genealogy of the Pires Ferreira family and Castello Branco family.
- Rodrigo Coutinho Marques (born in c. 1977): Artist and web developer, known for creating the online porn magazine Gostosa Home Page and for being a columnist for dp.net, from Diário de Pernambuco.
