= Fazenda Paraíso =

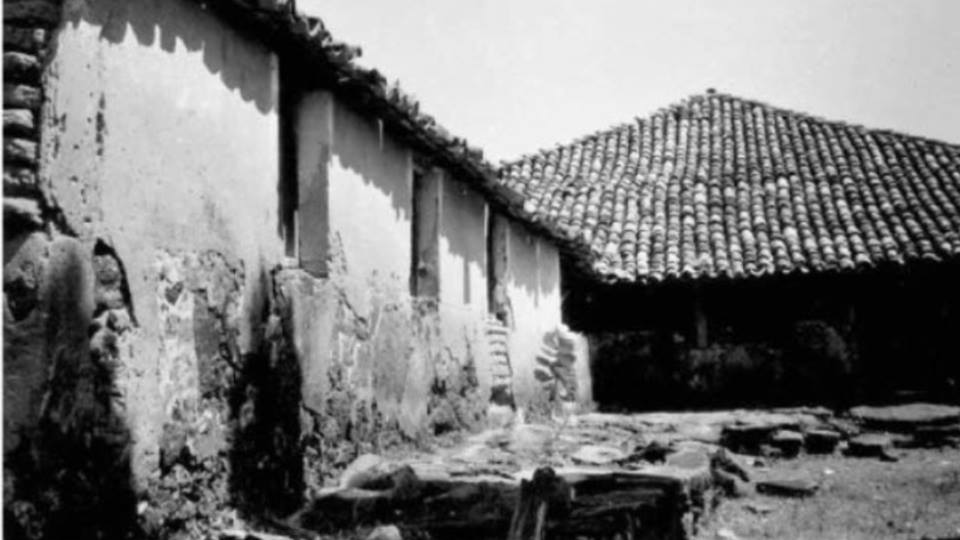
The casa-grande of the Pires Ferreira on Fazenda Paraíso

Fazenda Paraíso (Paradise Farm) is a fazenda built by Antônio Pires Ferreira in São Bernardo. Its engenho was the biggest of the Northeast of Maranhão and their casa-grande served as household of the Pires Ferreira family on the captaincy.

== History ==
Fazenda Paraíso was established in the 19th century by Antônio Pires Ferreira in São Bernardo. The Pires Ferreira family had properties on the banks of Parnaíba River since his father José Pires Ferreira inherited lands from Domingos Pires Ferreira and João Paulo Diniz, in the 18th century.

Antônio Pires Ferreira transformed the farm in the biggest sugarcane engenho of the Northeast of Maranhão. In 1845, he imported its central axis from Liverpool and in 1856, he built his casa-grande. He was also responsible for the development of the village of São Raimundo, building a senzala and the Chapel of Saint Raymond for his slaves. The chapel had a cemetery for the slaves, as the whites didn't want to be buried with the blacks. Other of his constructions was Rancho dos Negros (Black Ranch), a structure for the slaves to rest after peeling cassava.

In the 80s, the farm was property of Oseas Tobias de Castro.

== Production ==
Since 1845, the farm produces sugarcane using slave labor. The engenho was moved through animal traction or hydropower through the Parnaíba River.

The farm also produced rice, cotton, cassava, babaçu and carnaúba, and dealt with cattle. Antônio also built alembics for cachaça production and crushers for processing cotton and producing cassava flour.

In the 2000s, the property produced rapadura and cachaça.

== Casa-grande ==
The casa-grande became the household of Pires Ferreira family during the 18th century. It was built in 1853 in front of a swamp with many buritis.

It was built following the Northern Portuguese architecture, in a bungalow-style. The balcony, projected to the inside of the house, gave entrance to two rooms: The saints room to the left and the guest room to the right. It has a living room, kitchen, pantry, two other balconies and four extra rooms. The house was 20.5 x 25.05 m.

In 1868, Fernando Pires Ferreira operated the cataract of his mother, Lina Carlota de Jesus Rodrigues de Carvalho, inside the house. This was the first cataract surgery of Brazil.
