= Fernando Pires Ferreira =

Brazilian ophthalmologist and politician (1842–1907)

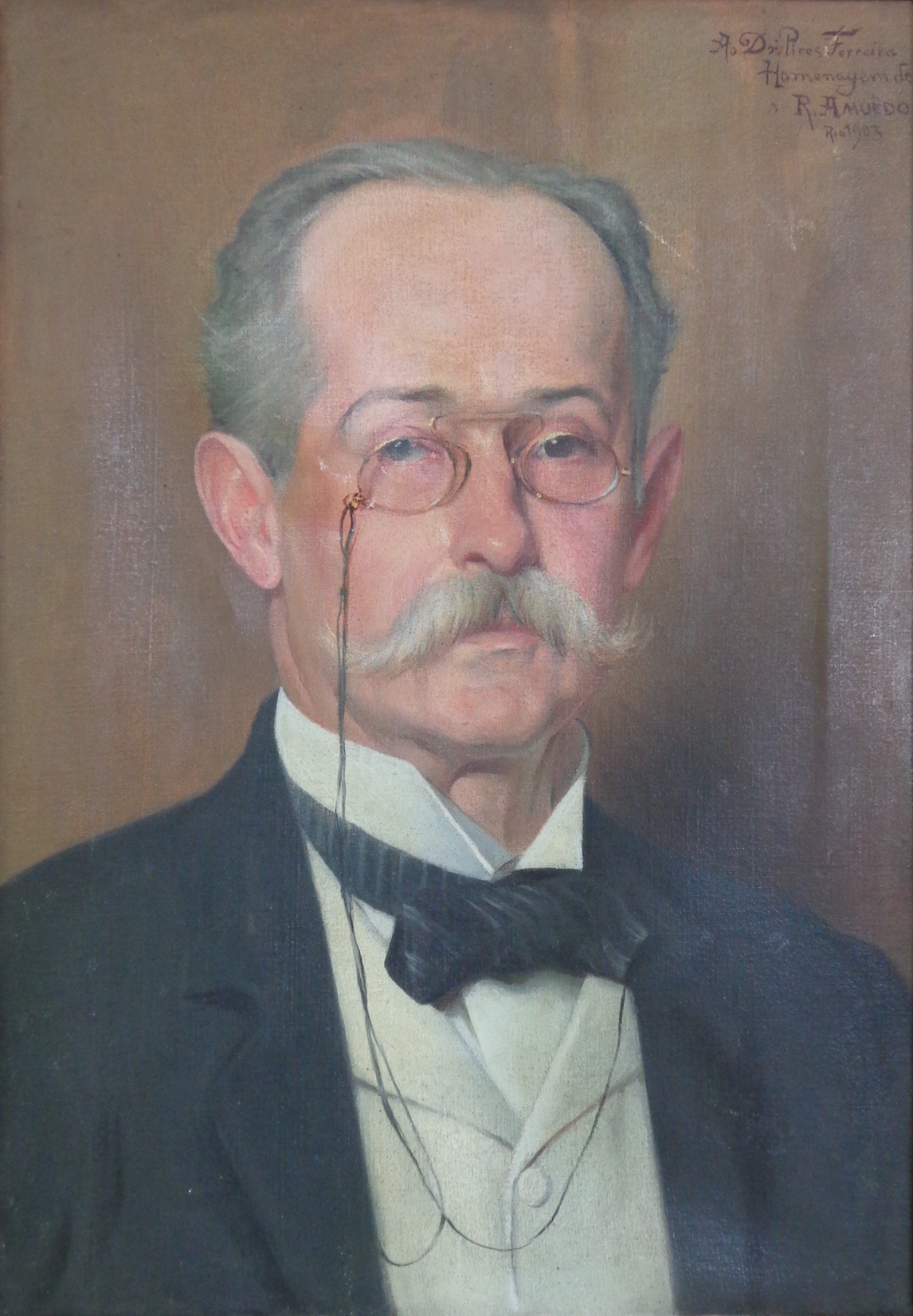
- 1903 portrait
- Born: 26 April 1842; Parnaíba, Brazil
- Died: 27 October 1907 (aged 65); Rio de Janeiro, Brazil
- Education: University of Paris Faculty of Medicine (1867)
- Known for: Father of ophthalmology in Brazil
- Relatives: Franklina Iria de Mendonça Cardoso (wife)
- Family: Pires Ferreira
- Medical career
- Profession: Doctor, surgeon
- Field: Ophthalmology
- Institutions: Santa Casa de Misericórdia; Hospital de São Francisco de Paula; Caixa de Socorros D. Pedro V; Police Brigade; Church and Convent of Saint Antony and Chapel of the Third Order
- Notable works: De l'opération de la cataracte par l'extraction linéaire scléroticale; Breves considerações sobre as aplicações da iridotomia no tratamento da catarata; Considerações sobre o pterígio e seu tratamento
- Awards: Imperial Order of the Rose

Congressman at the General Assembly (Brazil)
- In office 1876–1878
- Monarch: Dom Pedro II

Fernando Pires Ferreira (26 April 1842 – 27 October 1907) was a Brazilian ophthalmologist and politician, considered the father of ophthalmology in Brazil.

Born in Parnaíba, Fernando was member of the Pires Ferreira family and went to study in Paris when he was 15. He obtained his Doctor's degree in ophthalmology on 2 July 1867 by the University of Paris Faculty of Medicine and became the apprentice of Dr. Louis de Wecker.

Fernando returned to Brazil in 1868, where he supposedly operated on his mother's cataract. He then moved to Rio de Janeiro and was accepted on the Imperial Academy of Medicine in 1869. He worked at several establishments and founded the Graduation in Ophthalmology on Santa Casa de Misericórdia do Rio de Janeiro. Because of his work, he was laureated with the Imperial Order of the Rose.

== First years ==
Fernando Pires Ferreira was born in Parnaíba, Piauí, on 26 April 1842. He was the son of Antônio Pires Ferreira with Lina Carlota de Jesus Rodrigues de Carvalho, members of the Pires Ferreira family. He had 17 siblings, and was the 11th oldest. His family lived on Fazenda Paraíso, São Raimundo village, São Bernardo, but he was born in Parnaíba because the town's hospitals did not perform deliveries.

His father was a lieutenant colonel and had several lands in Magalhães de Almeida, Santa Rita, São Bernardo and others. He planted and processed sugar cane, rice, aguardiente, cotton and cassava flour. He also had cattle. The work was done using animal traction and slave labor.

His primary education began on 26 July 1837 at Engenho Paraíso, his father's engenho. He finished his secondary education in São Luís due the lack of schools in São Bernardo. There, he lived with his grandparents, Marianna de Deus Castro Diniz and José Pires Ferreira.

== Work in France ==
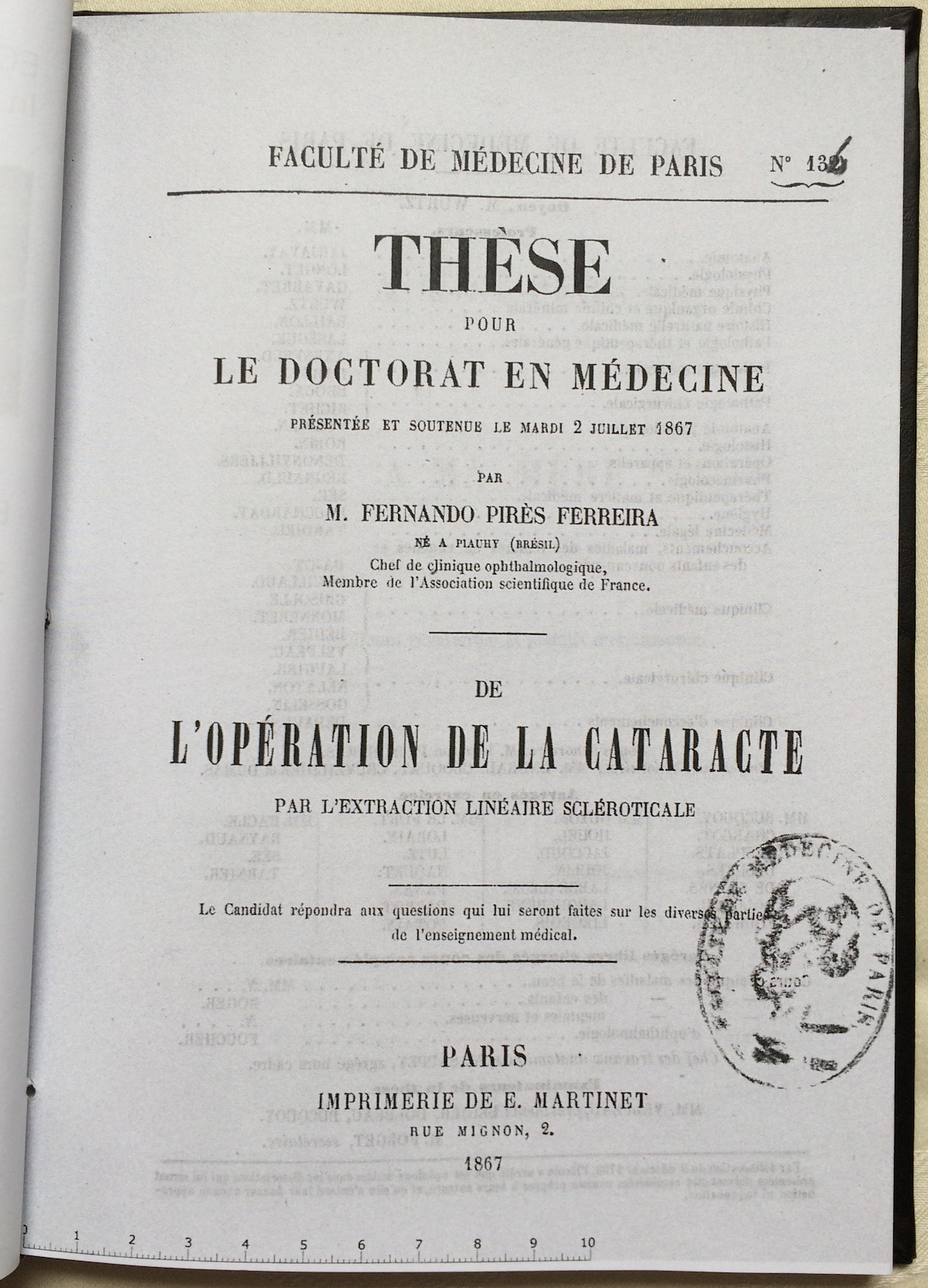
De l'opération de la cataracte par l'extraction linéaire scléroticale (1867)

Fernando moved to Paris, France, when he was 15 to finish his studies in humanities, where he graduated in Bachelor of Science. He obtained his Doctor's degree in ophthalmology on 2 July 1867 by the University of Paris Faculty of Medicine with the thesis "De l'opération de la cataracte par l'extraction linéaire scléroticale". (Cataract surgery by linear sclerotical extraction)

He then became auxiliary, assistant and later Chief of Ophthalmologic Clinic from Prof. Dr. Louis de Wecker. He was also a member of the French Academy of Sciences.

== Work in Brazil ==
Fernando returned to São Bernardo, Brazil, in 1868 and supposedly operated his mother's cataract using the dinner table at Fazenda Paraíso. According to the 1961 Bulletin of National Academy of Medicine and oral statements, the slaves called him a witch for "performing a miracle" in his 72-year-old mother and the phrase "[he] gave light to whom gave him light" (Note: In Portuguese, "to give light" (dar à luz) means "to give birth".) became consecrated.

In the same year, Fernando moved to Rio de Janeiro, living at Rua da Ajuda, 42, freguesia of Candelária church. He presented the thesis "Breves considerações sobre as aplicações da iridotomia no tratamento da catarata" (Brief considerations about iridotomy applications for cataract treatment) at Medical School of Rio de Janeiro and on 22 November 1869 he was admitted as a member of the Imperial Academy of Medicine (under the presidency of José Pereira Rego) after defending the thesis "Considerações sobre o pterígio e seu tratamento" (Considerations about the pterygium and its treatment). He is the youngest person ever to be admitted by the entity, at 27 year-old. He acted as the treasurer of the Imperial Academy, and was responsible for changing its name to National Academy of Medicine in 1889.

In 1872, Fernando founded the Graduation in Ophthalmology on Santa Casa de Misericórdia do Rio de Janeiro, thus becoming the "Father of Ophthalmology" in Brazil. He then began lecturing his specialty. Amongst his most notorious students, were Dr. Otávio Rego Lopes and Dr. José Antonio de Abreu Fialho. In 1881, he and Vicente Cândido Figueira de Saboia created the Chair of Ofthamologhy of the School of Medicine from Rio de Janeiro. Fernando indicated Dr. Hilário de Gouvêa as the first to fulfill the sit. He has worked at Santa Casa de Misericórdia, Hospital de São Francisco de Paula, Caixa de Socorros D. Pedro V, the Police Brigade and Church and Convent of Saint Antony and Chapel of the Third Order. On Sunday mornings, he used to operate the poor for free. He has also had an office at Rua do Rosário, 50 and after 64.

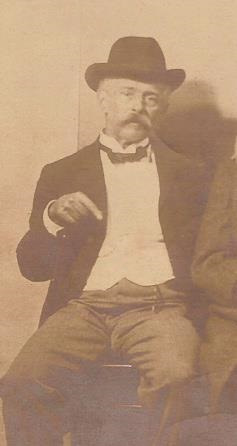
Fernando Pires Ferreira in 1906

Fernando served as Congressman in the General Assembly between 1876 and 1878, but he gave up his political career to dedicate himself to his profession. He has also been a member of the Finance Commission of the Protective Association of the Forlorn Infancy.

Fernando died on 27 October 1907 in his house, at Conde de Baependi street, Rio de Janeiro, from cerebral arteriosclerosis. He was buried at São João Batista cemetery.

== Personal life ==
Fernando married Franklina Iria de Mendonça Cardoso on 20 October 1838 at Paróquia São José e Santa Felicidade and had two children, Lina Franklina Pires Ferreira and Fernando Pires Ferreira Filho. Franklina died in 1887. Fernando was wasn't part of the First Brazilian Congress of Medicine due his mourning.

After the death of his parents, Fernando gained more than 6,200 braças of land as inheritance. When Fernando died, nor his children or his grandchildren inherited his lands. It was passed to his relatives that lived near the region.

== Awards and recognitition ==
Fernando became an Official of the Imperial Order of the Rose for his role as Delegate of the Public Institute, which he has done for free. Fernando has also been nominated a Viscount by Emperor Pedro II, but he refused the title.

He is the patron of the 18th chair of the Academy of Sciences of Piauí, and a street in Teresina was named after him.

On 29 June 2024, his biography, Fernando Pires Ferreira: Um Bruxo à Mesa de Jantar (Fernando Pires Ferreira: A Witch on the Dinner Table) was released. The book was written by Eneas do Rêgo Barros and co-published by the Academy of Sciences of Piauí and Editora Nova Aliança.
