= Manuel Congo =

Brazilian rebel

- Born: Kingdom of Congo
- Died: 6 September 1839; Vassouras, Rio de Janeiro, Empire of Brazil

Manuel Congo (died 6 September 1839) was the leader of the largest slave rebellion in the Vale do Paraíba region of Brazil. The revolt occurred in the town of Paty do Alferes, in the state of Rio de Janeiro. After an enslaved person was killed by an overseer on the plantation, Manuel Congo and other enslaved people on the plantation, including Mariana Crioula, coordinated and organized a mass fleeing of enslaved people from the plantation.

== Precedents ==
=== The Vassouras region in 1838 ===
By 1838, the center of the Brazilian national economy came to be the southern region of the state of Rio de Janeiro, in which there were massive levels of deforestation and the introduction of coffee cultivation. At that time, around 70% of the coffee exported from Brazil was grown in the land around the village of Vassouras, which included the municipality of the same name, as well as Mendes, Paty do Alferes, Miguel Pereira and parts of Paracambi. The coffee plantations were also expanded to the neighboring municipalities of Valença and Paraíba do Sul, where the two were already the main sources of economic sustenance of the Brazilian empire. Paty do Alferes was the most rich out of the freguesias of Vassouras and the first point of colonization in the region, since it was also on the oldest route between the port of Rio de Janeiro and the inland mining region of Minas Gerais.

The intense economic growth of the region created massive demand for slave labor in which enslaved peoples were sold from other states or were forcibly enslaved from Africa. This was the period in which Brazil had the largest number of enslaved peoples taken from Africa in the Atlantic Slave Trade.

The population of Vassouras grew rapidly from the expansion of coffee farming in the region, but the slave population was much higher than free people, white or non-white. In 1840, Vassouras had 20,589 residents, of whom 6,225 were free and 14,333 were enslaved. By 1850, however, the population had reached 35,000 people (the same population of the current municipality, though in a much smaller area).

A large part of the enslaved peoples were made up of young African men. According to data from 1837 to 1840, around 75% of the enslaved peoples were of African origin, 68% were in the 15-40 age range, and 73.7% were men.

The Malê revolt that occurred in the state of Bahia in 1835 made the Brazilian elite fearful of new rebellions throughout the empire. The complaints and rumors of revolt were common in every place where there were many enslaved people. The "pretos minas", those that were born in West Africa, were especially the target of these rumors as they had been involved in the Malê revolt.

=== Manuel Congo ===
It was said that Manuel Congo, who was a blacksmith, was a strong and skillful man, who spoke little and rarely smiled. As was common among those forcibly enslaved from Africa, his name was composed of a Portuguese first name and a last name associated with the name of their "nation" or region of origin. The person who enslaved Manuel Congo was captain-major Manuel Francisco Xavier, who had enslaved dozens of people on the Freguesia and Maravilha plantations in Paty do Alferes.

=== Mariana Crioula ===
Mariana Crioula was an enslaved woman that, as her last name implied, was born in Brazil, and was 30 years old by the time of the rebellion. She was a seamstress and maid of Francisca Elisa Xavier, the wife of Manuel Francisco Xavier. At that time, men made up 90% of the enslaved people forced out of Africa and around 75% of enslaved people that worked on coffee plantations, and as such a married enslaved couple was rare. She participated in the large slave rebellion and was named the queen, along with Manuel Congo. In 1839, she was captured, but was absolved, as were most enslaved women on the plantation.

=== Manuel Francisco and Francisca Elisa Xavier ===
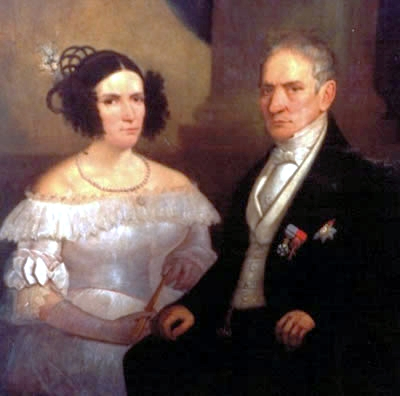
Manuel Francisco Xavier and his wife, Francisca Elisa Xavier, future baroness of Soledade

Captain-major Manuel Francisco Xavier was a rich landowner that owned three plantations in Paty do Alferes: Freguesia (currently Aldeia de Arcozelo), Maravilha and Santa Tereza, along with Cachoeira farm. Manuel Francisco Xavier was married to Francisca Elisa Xavier, who would be later given the title of the Baroness of Soledade, the first person with the title. According to coronel Francisco Peixoto de Lacerda Vernek, Xavier was inconsistent in his treatment of the people he enslaved, at points being lenient, at other points extremely severe. An inventory made of Xavier's property, made in 1840 and two years after Manuel Congo revolted, counted 449 enslaved people, 85% of whom were men and 80% were African.

== Rebellion and Escape ==
On 5 November 1838, the foreman of the Freguesia plantation shot and killed Camilo Sapateiro, an enslaved African, as he was allegedly going to the Maravilha plantation without being authorized. The enslaved people attempted to kill the foreman, but were restrained. No punishment was given for the killing and the intention to revolt grew in the senzalas (slave quarters) on Xavier's plantations.

Around midnight, the doors of the senzalas of the Freguesia plantation were broken and a group of around 80 enslaved Black people ran across the courtyard, called to the enslaved people in the casa-grande that had been sleeping on the floor, broke into the weapon depots and took machetes and an old garrucha.

The people who revolted fled and hid in the forests on the Santa Catarina plantation, the property of captain Carlos de Miranda Jordão. The following night, the rebels had left the forest for the Maravilha plantation, another plantation of Xavier's. They had threatened to kill the foreman, but he had fled to the roof of the house; they beat an enslaved person that did not want to participate and put a ladder to the kitchen window so that the enslaved people in the casa-grande that were sleeping there could escape. They opened the doors to the senzalas and called for the other enslaved people to join them. They later broke into the grocery depot and took the castrated pigs that were still fattening, and fled with all the tools and supplies that they could have carried. On the way, the group of enslaved people passed through the nearby Pau Grande plantation, which belonged to Paulo Gomes Ribeiro de Avelar, where they freed the enslaved people in the senzalas. At this point, the fugitive slaves were already numbered more than 100, most of whom were armed with machetes and other bladed weapons.

Aware of the events, many enslaved people also fled from the São Luís da Boa Vista, Cachoeira, Santa Teresa, and Monte Alegre plantations, along with others who were not listed in the historical record. As many as 300 to 400 enslaved people became part of the group as they traversed the dense forests of the Serra da Estrela, on the way to the Serra da Taquara. There had been in all likelihood prior planning, but many enslaved people had quickly joined the group from other plantations and there were meeting points in the forests for the various groups.

Manuel Congo was certainly the leader of the revolt, and at this point had likely been joined by Mariana Crioula, such that the two were afterwards given the titles of "king" and "queen" of the rebelling group. Another enslaved person had been given the title of "vice-king", and it has been proposed that this person was Epifânio Moçambique, an African from the Munhambane region and who had been enslaved on the Pau Grande plantation; However, the vice-king may have been someone else that had been killed in combat.

Various groups of runaway slaves went into the forest and, at the end of each evening, assembled at a ranch for an overnight stay. It is not clear if they had intended to create a quilombo. Surviving in the forests required strong knowledge of the and, as the facts would show, the enslaved peoples' ability to retaliate was strong.

== Fights and capture ==
Xavier had asked for help from a local squire from the freguesia of Nossa Senhora da Conceição do Paty do Alferes, lieutenant coronel José Pinheiro de Souza Vernek, though was not successful He had already had a prolonged political conflict with sergeant-major and later padre Inácio de Sousa Vernek, the grandfather of José Pinheiro de Souza Vernek and chief colonel of the 13th Legion of the National Guard Francisco Peixoto de Lacerda Vernek. Alarmed by the number of fugitive enslaved people, José Pinheiro immediately sent a letter to his cousin Lacerda Vernek, who later became the baron of Pati do Alferes, for providences, in favor "of order and peace". The 13th Legion was based in Valença and also maintained public order in Vassouras and Paraíba do Sul.

Just 48 hours after the last incident, Lacerda Vernek brought 160 men from the National Guard who were well armed and ready for conflict. At the same time, he sent a memorandum to the president of the province of Rio de Janeiro informing him of the situation and asking for help. The regiment, led by Lacerda Vernek, and accompanied by José Pinheiro, met up at the Maravilha plantation on 10 November. The following day, they had left in search of the revolting enslaved people. The location of the escape routes were found and the advance was rapid, as the people who fled had to create openings in the dense forest that were commonplace in the region. As Lacerda Vernek recounted in one of his memorandums, at 5 o'clock in the evening on 11 November, after travelling some leagues and hours of searching, "We had felt jabs from a machete and people talking". They had discovered the main group of runaway slaves who had slowly advanced on with children, women, and the elderly. The group had realized they had been discovered and prepared to fight. The regiment continued on in a wedge shape and demanded everyone to surrender. Manuel Congo initiated the attack. Lacerda Vernek described the enslaved people as such:

"they made a line", took up arms, "one with fire, the others with blades", and shouted: "Shoot men, shoot the devils". "This insult was followed by discharge which killed two of ours and injured two others. How expensive what cost them! Twenty and such rolled into the hill below at our first discharge, one dead and others gravely injured, which broadly turned into a shooting, to which they cowardly turned their backs, dropping some of their weapons; they were chased after and shot at in retreat and completely scurried."(…)"I noted that not even one of them did so when demanded to stop, needing to be shot in the legs. A crioula (enslaved person born in Brazil) who had been one of Dona Francisca Xavier's preferred slaves did not surrender despite being beaten, and shouted: To die, yes. To surrender, never!!!"

In the end, the survivors were surrounded and forced to surrender. In this one battle, both Manuel Congo and Mariana Crioula were imprisoned. The supplies and the weapons were hastily abandoned as they ran for their lives. Others were captured in the following days.

They could not capture a group of runaway slaves commanded by one João Angola, who escaped from combat and could not reach the meeting point with Manuel Congo's group. The day prior to the final fight, João Angola's group was seen trying to attack a gunpowder factory in the region and fled in the direction of Serra do Couto, near Serra da Estrela.

Afterwards, on 14 November, a regiment of 50 men arrived from the military and from the police department in Niterói, invited by the provincial president. The commander was lieutenant coronel Luís Alves de Lima, the future Duke of Caxias.

== Trial and execution ==
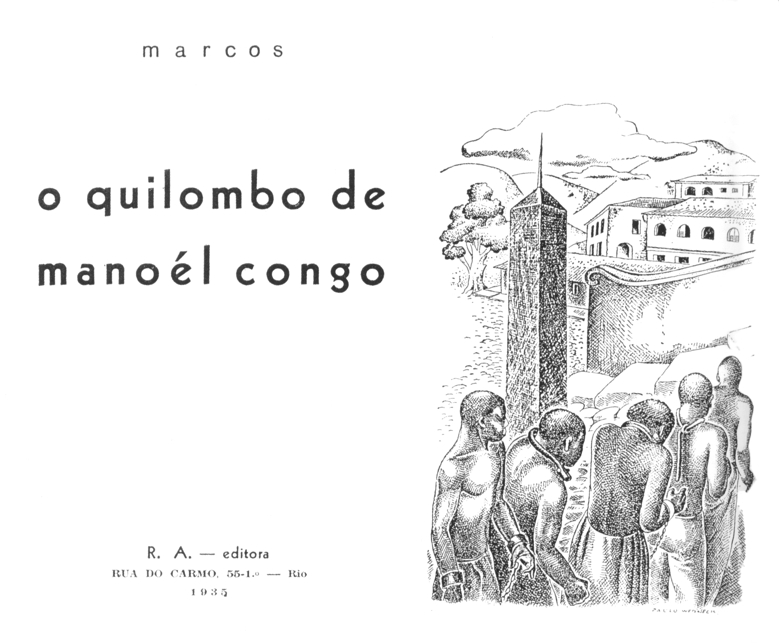
Book cover about the slave revolt led by Manuel Congo, written by Carlos Lacerda using the pseudonym Marcos (1935).

Despite there having been more than 300 fugitives, just 16 were arrested and brought to trial: Manuel Congo, Pedro Dias, Vicente Moçambique, Antônio Magro, Justino Benguela, Belarmino, Miguel Crioulo, Canuto Moçambique, Afonso Angola, Adão Benguela, Marianna Crioula, Rita Crioula, Lourença Crioula, Joanna Mofumbe, Josefa Angola and Emília Conga. The people that enslaved by other plantation owners were not put on trial, including those who had participated. For example, Epifânio Moçambique was cited by many testimonies as one of the leaders alongside Manuel Congo and perhaps had been vice-king of the rebellion, though he was just interrogated during the penal process.

The defendants were sent in chains to be sentenced in Vassouras. The townspeople came together to witness their arrival. One of the imprisoned, perhaps Marianna Crioula, again shouted that she would prefer to die than to return to captivity, which enraged the crowd and then tried to lynch her. Of the 17 defendants, 9 were men and 7 were women, with 11 being those from Africa and 5 being born in Brazil. 10 were those that had specific skillsets or worked in the casa-grande, while just 2 were those that worked in the fields. Some were blacksmiths, such as Manuel Congo, while others were carpenters or boilermakers; all the women worked in the casa-grande as seamstresses, worked with laundry, or were nurses. From the morning of 22 January 1839 to the 31st, the tribunal met at the Praça da Concórdia, opposite the Igreja Matriz da Vila de Vassouras. The trial was presided over by interim judge Inácio Pinheiro de Souza Verneck, brother of José Pinheiro and cousin of Lacerda Vernek.

Mariana Crioula's participation in the rebellion caused furor at the trial, due to her being trusted by the plantation owner and his family, who, according to Lacerda Vernek, even while being beaten shouted "To die, yes. To surrender, never." While interrogated, Marianna Crioula tried to downplay her participation and that she had been forced to flee, but the other defendants asserted that she was in fact the "queen" of the revolters. Through an agreement that was made, only the main leader of the rebellion would be sentenced for the death of two soldiers during the rebellion. As the defendants indicated Manuel Congo as the leader, he was sentenced to death by hanging.

Another seven were sentenced to "650 lashes, given 50 times a day, according to the law", and "three years with iron hinges to their necks". Adão Benguela was the only man totally absolved of any wrongdoing, despite being implicated in the rebellion as much as the others. The biggest surprise was Mariana Crioula and the other women involved being absolved, seemingly at the request of Francisca Elisa Xavier. However, Mariana Crioula was forced to watch the public execution of Manuel Congo.

On 4 September 1839, Manuel Congo was hung at Largo da Forca in Vassouras, and was not buried.

== Consequences ==
There are no exact statistics of how many enslaved people left and how many were forcibly returned to the plantation. However, there were people, such as those from João Angola's groups, that may have been able to escape to freedom and, even though there are no historical records of such, are said to have formed the legendary quilombo of Santa Catarina. What is known is that there was not enough time for a quilombo founded by Manuel Congo to be created, of which is frequently cited as fact.

Manuel Congo's rebellion created great insecurity among plantation owners in the region. This climate of fear remained for decades during the entire heyday of coffee production in the region. Some attempts at revolt still occurred. In 1847, there was a complaint made that another blacksmith, the free Black man Estêvão Pimenta, had led a secret organization that had been preparing for a revolt for the 24th day of June of that year. The organization had been infiltrated by 6 soldiers; Pimenta and the other collaborators were arrested, and perhaps due to their imprisonment, no such revolt occurred. The police registers at the time affirmed that the organization, called Elbanda (or maybe also Embanda, meaning a priest or doctor in the Kimbundu language) was made up of clandestine planning centers led by enslaved blacksmiths (like Manuel Congo) and joiners, called Pais-Korongos or Tatas-Korongos.

The official end of the Atlantic Slave Trade in Brazil came with the passing of the Eusébio de Queirós Law, and later forced the enslavers to improve living conditions on their plantations, and was later followed by the abolition of slavery with the Lei Áurea in 1888.

== Local history ==
The Freguesia plantation, where the revolt began, is currently the Aldeia de Arcozelo cultural center in Paty do Alferes, the largest cultural center by area in Latin America. Currently, Aldeia de Arcozelo is administrated by the National Foundation of the Arts, as part of the Ministry of Culture. It has been left abandoned and in a precarious state of conservation due to consistent neglect from authorities, and visiting the site has been prohibited. The old chapel of the casa-grande was consecrated towards the memory of the enslaved people imprisoned during the rebellion. In front of the church, the names of Manuel Congo and other imprisoned slaves have been inscribed; however, the names of more than 20 enslaved people were lost from memory as they were not registered in the penal processes.

The Largo da Forca, where Manuel Congo was executed, is currently Largo da Pedreira, in Vassouras. The Memorial of Manuel Congo was built here in 1996.

== Bibliography ==
- RAPOSO, Ignacio. Historia de Vassouras. Vassouras, Fundação 1º de Maio, 1935.
- SCISÍNIO, Alaôr Eduardo. Dicionário da Escravidão. Rio de Janeiro, Léo Christiano Editorial Ltda, 1997.
- «TOLEDO, Renato Pompeu. À Sombra da Escravidão»
- GOMES, Flávio dos Santos. Histórias de Quilombolas. São Paulo, Companhia das Letras, 2006.
- «FRIDMAN, Fania; Planejamento e Rede Urbana no Sertão do Oeste Fluminense»
- SOUZA, Alan de Carvalho. Terras e Escravos: A desordem senhorial no Vale do Paraíba. Jundiaí, Paco Editorial: 2012.
