= José Pires Ferreira =

Brazilian merchant

- Born: 1757; São Frei Pedro Gonçalves, Recife
- Died: Unknown; Barra do Longá, Buriti dos Lopes
- Occupations: Merchant, farmer
- Spouse: Marianna de Deus Castro Diniz
- Children: 4, including Antônio
- Parents: Domingos Pires Ferreira (father); Joana Maria de Deus Correia Pinto (mother)
- Family: Pires Ferreira

José Pires Ferreira (born 1757) was a rich farmer and merchant. He was the responsible for the definitive establishment of the Pires Ferreira family in Piauí.

== Biography ==
José was born in 1757, in freguesia de São Frei Pedro Gonçalves, Recife, son of Domingos Pires Ferreira and Joanna Maria de Deus Correia Pinto. He had 13 siblings, being the 6th oldest.

José was a merchant. Two or three times a year, he went along the coast selling his products, including imported items, such as silk, shoes, perfumes, porcelains and spices, until he reached Paranaíba.

After his marriage with Marianna, José moved to Santa Cruz das Pedras Preguiças farm, an old house from the parents of his wife. He and his wife inherited lands in Barra do Longá, Parnaíba, from their parents and in 1795 the couple already lived in the region that today is Magalhães de Almeida, Cabo de Santo Agostinho, Santa Rita and São Bernardo. Amongst the farms they inherited, are Santo Agostinho, Sambaíba, Santa Maria, Santo Inácio and Melancias. José bought more land on Baixo Parnaíba. He also had a house in Parnaíba, but he spent more time in his commercial settlement in Barra do Longá, where he controlled the flow of his products in the Longá and Parnaíba Rivers. He also became one of the most important farmers from the region, and was a slave owner. He was also a Captain from the army.

He died on an unknown date on Barra do Longá, Buriti dos Lopes.

== Personal life ==
José married in 1786 with Marianna de Deus Castro Diniz, daughter of João Paulo Diniz, pioneer of the dried meat industry in Brazil. He had four children, Rosa Maria, João de Deus, Maria da Assumpção and Antônio.
