= Francisca Elisa Xavier =

Brazilian plantation owner (1786–1855)

- Baroness of Soledade
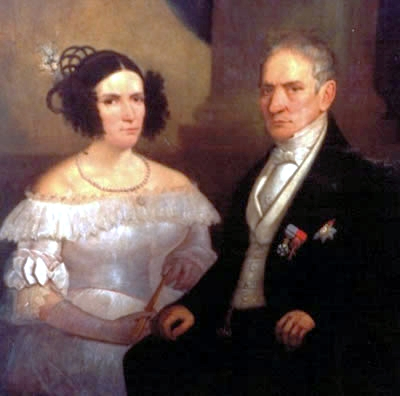
- Francisca Elisa and Manuel Francisco Xavier
- Born: 1 November 1786; Paty do Alferes, Rio de Janeiro, Colonial Brazil
- Died: 12 October 1855 (aged 68); Niterói, Rio de Janeiro, Empire of Brazil
- Spouse: Manuel Francisco Xavier

Francisca Elisa Xavier, Baroness of Soledade (1 November 1786 – 12 October 1855) was a Brazilian plantation owner and noblewoman. She, along with her husband Manuel Francisco Xavier, were wealthy land owners in the Vale do Paraíba region of what is now the state of Rio de Janeiro. These included the Freguesia (currently Aldeia de Arcozelo), Maravilha and Santa Tereza plantations, along with Cachoeira farm. The largest slave revolt in the region, led by Manuel Congo and Mariana Crioula, occurred on the plantations they had owned.

She married Manuel Francisco Xavier in 1804. Born in Paty do Alferes, she would later move to the city of Niterói after her husband's death. She died in 1855.

== Bibliography ==
- RAPOSO, Ignacio. Historia de Vassouras. Vassouras: Fundação 1º de Maio, 1935.
- SOUZA, Alan de Carvalho. Terras e Escravos: A desordem senhorial no Vale do Paraíba. Jundiaí, Paco Editorial: 2012.

== See also ==
- Manuel Congo
- Mariana Crioula
- Manuel Francisco Xavier
