= Firmino Pires Ferreira =

Marshal Firmino Pires Ferreira
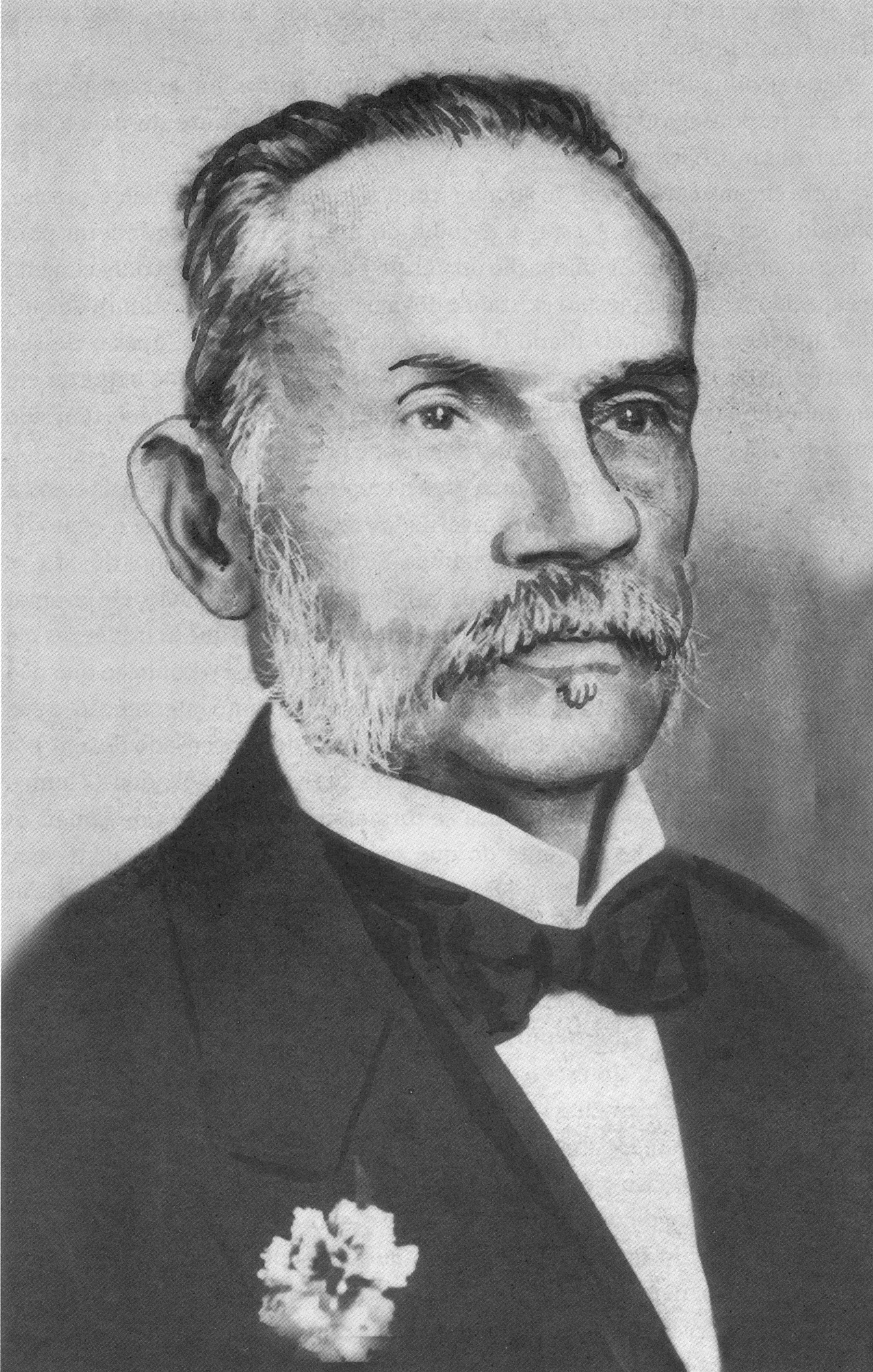
- Nickname: Mad Cow
- Born: 25 September 1848; Barras
- Died: 21 July 1930 (aged 81) Rio de Janeiro
- Allegiance: Empire of Brazil; United States of Brazil
- Branch: Brazilian Army
- Service years: 1865–1930
- Rank: Marshal
- Conflicts: Paraguayan War; Passage of Humaitá; Battle of Piribebuy; Revolta da Armada; Federalist Revolution
- Awards: Military Order of Avis; Imperial Order of the Cross
- Education: Court Military School
- Spouse: Lina Pires Ferreira (m. 1875)
- Children: 3

Federal Deputy for the Brazilian National Congress
- In office 1891–1893
- President: Floriano Peixoto

Senator for the Federal Senate of Brazil
- In office 1894–1920
- President: Prudente de Moraes; Campos Sales; Rodrigues Alves; Afonso Pena; Nilo Peçanha; Hermes da Fonseca; Wenceslau Braz; Delfim Moreira; Epitacio Pessoa

Senator for the Federal Senate of Brazil
- In office 1927–1930
- President: Washington Luís

Firmino Pires Ferreira (25 September 1848 – 21 July 1930) was a Brazilian military officer and politician from the Pires Ferreira family.

Born in Barras, he enlisted and fought in the Paraguayan War when he was 17. He was part of important battles and reached the rank of 1st Lieutenant. Back in Brazil, he moved to Rio de Janeiro and graduated at the Court Military School. During the Empire of Brazil, he served in several roles and reached the rank of Lieutenant Colonel.

Firmino helped Deodoro da Fonseca with the military coup against Dom Pedro II during the Proclamation of the Republic on 15 November 1889. He fought in the Revolta da Armada and the Federalist Revolution during Floriano Peixoto's government. He gained military prestige and reached the rank of Marshal in 1906.

Firmino had a huge influence in politics both in Piauí and Rio de Janeiro. While in Rio he was known to be gentle, he used his influence in Piauí "with an iron fist". In Rio, he served as federal deputy from 1891 to 1893 and as senator from 1894 to 1920 and 1927 to 1930. In Piauí, he fought with the local families for power and exercised great power for most of the state history through the Old Republic, with its apex from 1896 to 1908, the so-called "piferismo" political movement.

He just got his power back after the pachequismo movement, but he died on 1930, leaving a gap of power fulfilled by Getúlio Vargas allies. His family was then politically persecuted by the Estado Novo.

== First years ==
Firmino was born in Barras, on 25 September 1848, the son of José Pires Ferreira and Maria Joaquina de Jesus Castello Branco Carvalho de Almeida. He had 10 siblings, and was the 5th youngest. He also had 12 half-siblings.

== Empire of Brazil ==
=== Paraguayan War ===
Firmino enlisted in the Brazilian Army on 11 January 1865 as a private. He volunteered to fight in the Paraguayan War and served the Engineering Battalion. On 18 January 1868, he was promoted to lieutenant and was given the responsibility for transporting construction material through the Chaco pathway. His performance was cheered by the Captain Manoel Peixoto Cursino de Amarante.

On 19 February 1868, Firmino was part of the Passage of Humaitá, where he served the charcana garrison. On 8 May, he commanded 24 sappers and destroyed the defense structures from the Paraguayan troops that were obstructing the Chaco passageway. In the same year, he was onboard of the monitor Rio Grande during a mission to protect the withdrawal of the Brazilian infantry. His performance was cheered by the Marquis of Caxias. He also helped taking over the fortifications that covered the passage of Jebiquari. On 12 August 1869, he was part of the Battle of Piribebuy. He was part of the vanguard troops that took over Piribebuy and was wounded. He was cheered by the Captain Deodoro da Fonseca and promoted to 1st Lieutenant. During the war, he became personal friends with Deodoro, Floriano Peixoto and Hermes da Fonseca.

=== Military education and career ===
In 1870, Firmino came back from the war and moved to Rio de Janeiro. He was accepted in the Court Military School. He graduated and was promoted to captain in 1874. In 1875, he taught at the Tiro de Guerra of Campo Grande, in Mato Grosso. In 1879, he was promoted as Major and joined the Artillery General Staff. In 1889, he was promoted as Lieutenant Colonel and became Subdirector of the War Arsenal.

Firmino was a personal friend of Emperor Pedro II.

== Old Republic ==
=== First years in the Old Republic ===
Firmino helped Deodoro da Fonseca overthrow Emperor Pedro II Hering the Proclamation of the Republic on 15 November 1889 and was promoted to colonel in 1890.

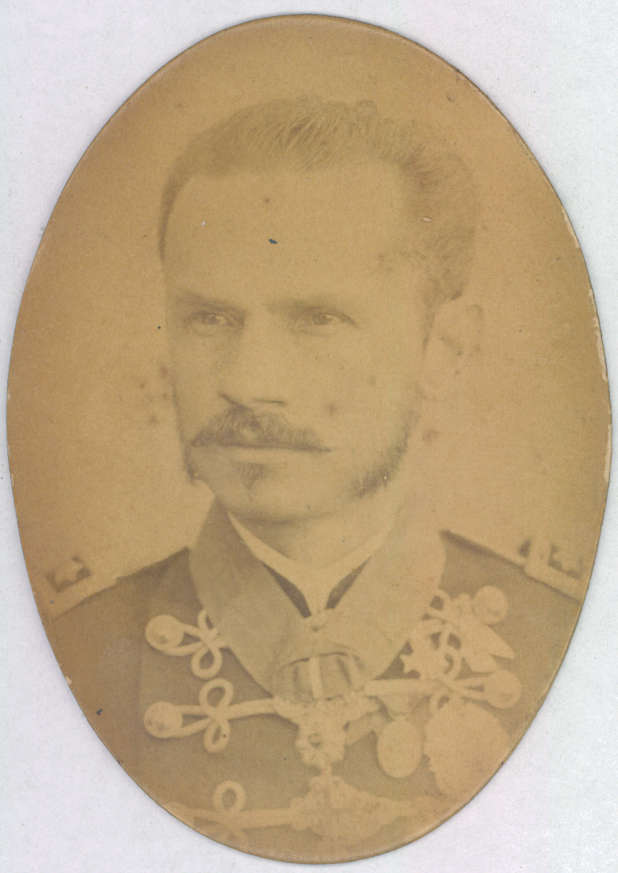
Firmino Pires Ferreira as a Federal Deputy in 1890

Firmino was elected as Federal Deputy for Piauí on 15 September 1890, partaking on the first legislature of the National Constituent Congress. He served from 24 February 1891 until December 1893. He was one of the elaborators of the Brazilian Constitution of 1891.

Firmino signed the Brazilian Constitution of 1891

In September 1893, he commanded the 6th Brigade to defend Floriano Peixoto's government during the Revolta da Armada. Firmino later went to São Paulo to fight against the Federalist Revolution in Itararé. He was commanding 3,000 men when Captain Luiz Pinto Pereira surrendered without fighting on 27 February 1894. On 13 March, the Army decided to go on a frontal assault, as the Revolta da Armada was officially defeated and the federalists didn't have support from ships. On 21 March, Pires Ferreira, Braz Albrantes and João Teixeira da Silva Braga occupied Jaguariaíva.

In 1894, he was elected as Senator. He was reelected 9 times, serving up until 1920, and was part of the Commissions of the Navy, War and Constitution and Justice. In 1895, he was promoted to Brigadier general. During his time as Senator, he defended the proliferation of Military Schools to prepare the Brazilian Army properly for defending the country.

Firmino was also a First Class Instructor in the Military School of Realengo from Rio de Janeiro and Rio Grande do Sul and Inspector of the Military Schools of Rio de Janeiro and Rio Grande do Sul.

=== Colligation and Consecration ===
Firmino was influential on the Federal Government and on Piauí state. He was known for being gentle in Rio de Janeiro, while he ruled Piauí "with an iron hand". He controlled his state using his relatives.

Firmino was part from political movements known as Colligation and Consecration. Piauí politics was dominated by Coelho Rodrigues and allies, a movement called "coelhado". In 1892, Coriolano de Carvalho e Silva, Governor of Piauí, fought with Baron of Castelo Branco, as the later denied an alliance to exclude Simplício Coelho de Resende from politics. The situation worsened when Resende was arrested in 1895 in the Gabino Besouro Government for publishing a note in his journal, O Democrata, for the hiring of a sentenced criminal as cooker for the Government Palace.

In 1896, Firmino and other powerful politicians that felt excluded formed a colligation against Raimundo Arthur de Vasconcelos, Governor of Piauí and political inheritor from Coriolano de Carvalho. The colligation was supported by the president Prudente de Morais and used O Democrata to attack the Governor. Raimundo, then, closed himself in an inner circle for the elections of 1896 and tried to renovate his allies as senators and congressmen. One of the candidates for the Senate in the Raimundo colligation was Joaquim de Lima Pires Ferreira, brother of Raimundo. Firmino group allied with the Federal Republican Party (PRF) and the Republican Legalist Party (PRL), but the elections were deemed fraudulent by both sides. In the same year, Coelho Rodrigues lost his reelection to the Senate when his ally, Joaquim Nogueira Paranaguá, changed sides to Pires Ferreira favor and was elected instead.

In 1897, Firmino was promoted to Quartermaster General.

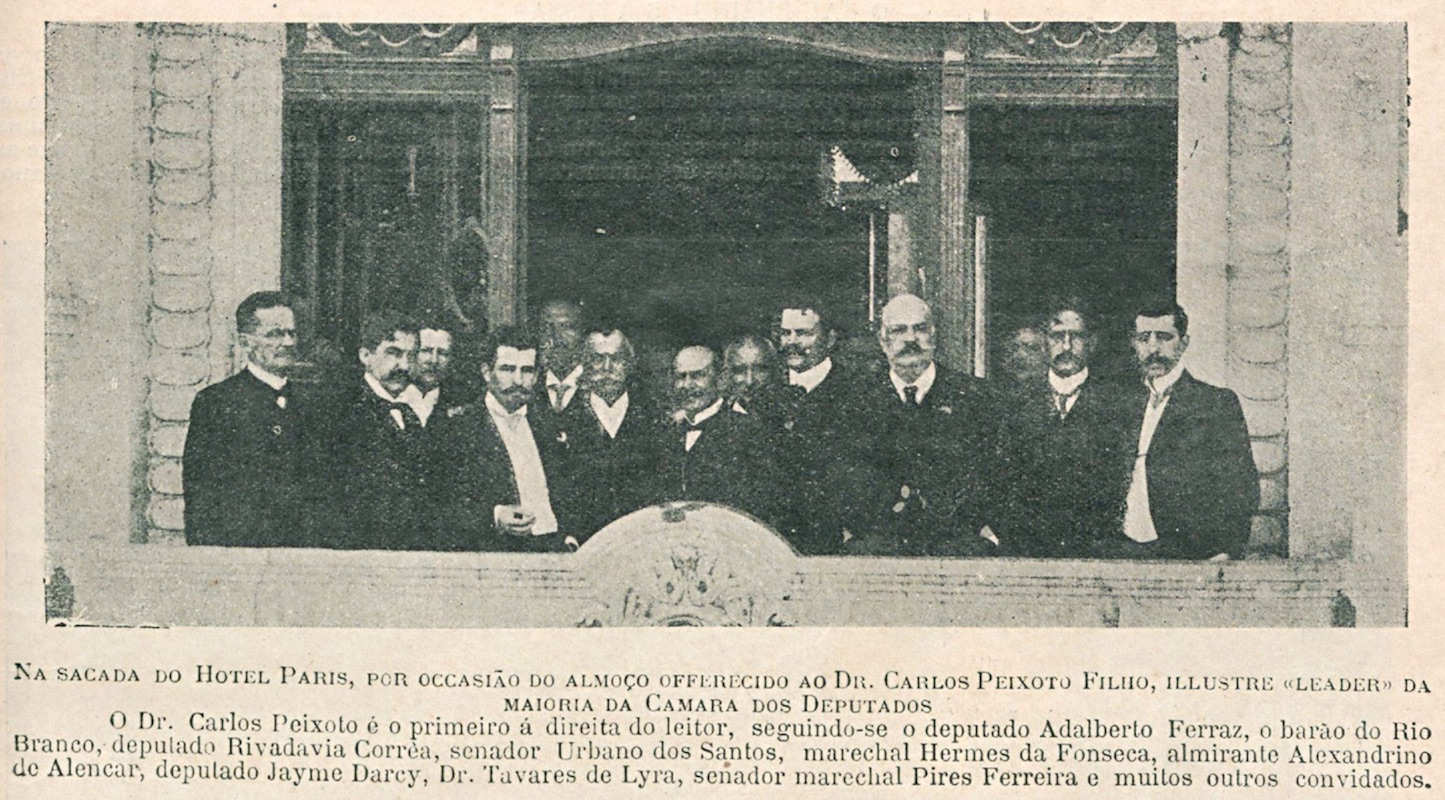
Firmino in an article from O Malho (1907)

In 1898, Raimundo agreed in excluding Coriolano de Carvalho from politics, and a new arrange of power known as Consecration was made. Many of the opponents of Raimundo were politically persecuted afterwards. From 1896 until 1908, Fernando's ideas were prevalent in Piauí politics, a movement known as "piferismo".

In 1901, Firmino was promoted to Divisional general. In 1906, he was promoted as Marshal.

=== Freirismo ===
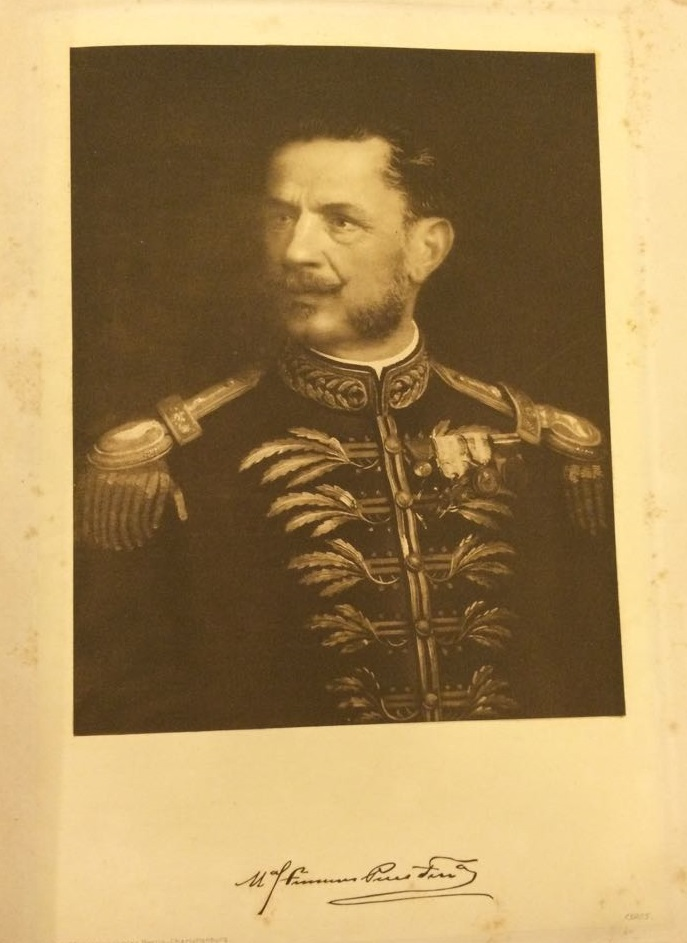
Firmino in 1911

In 1909, Antonio Freire Silva went to power after the death of Anísio Auto de Abreu, and the Federal Government gained more influence in the state. The influence of "piferismo" diminished to Antonio Freire's ideas, what came to be known as "freirismo".

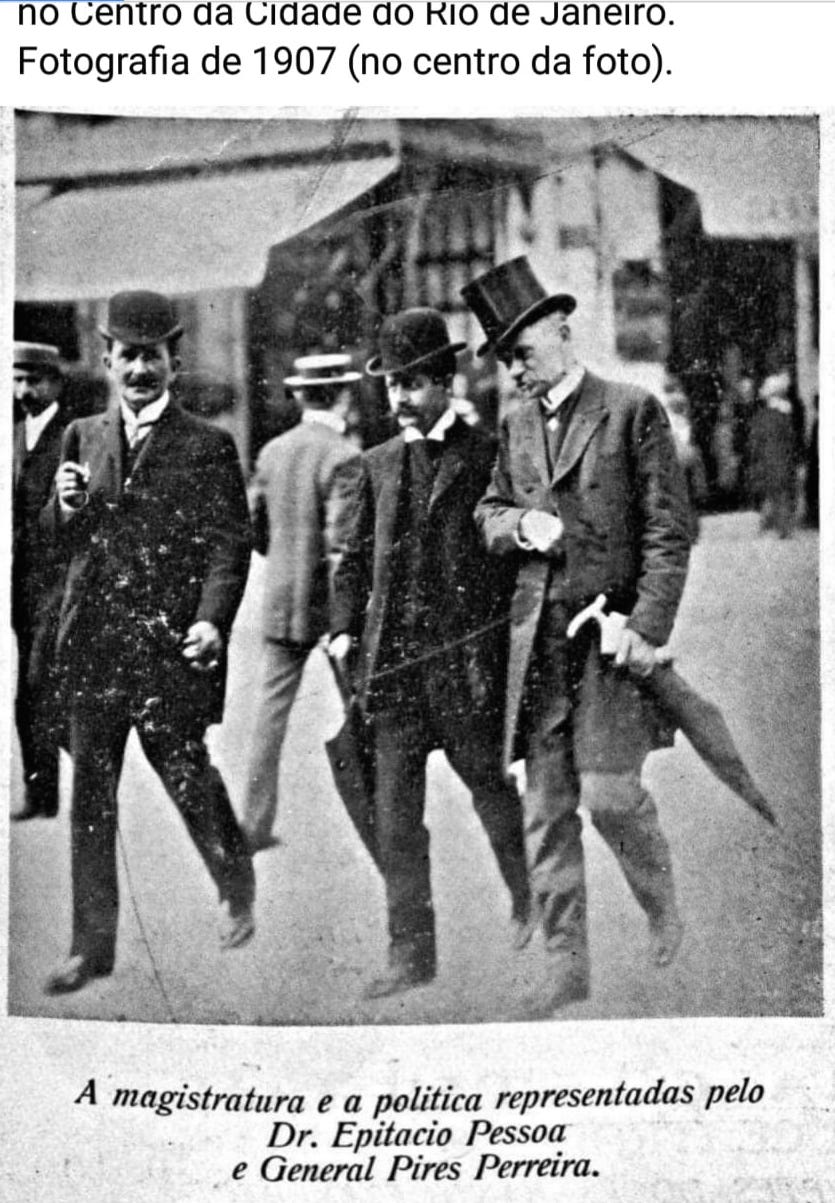
Epitácio Pessoa (center) and Firmino Pires Ferreira (right) walking together in downtown Rio de Janeiro in 1918

On 5 November 1910, Firmino helped to found the Republican Conservative Party (PRC). The party was initially presided by his friend from the Paraguayan War Pinheiro Machado. Firmino was the vice-president, but later was promoted to president. Pinheiro Machado helped him to control de Senate until his murder.

In 1912, Miguel Rosa is elected as Governor of Piauí, shaking once again the balance of power of the state. An ally of the Mendes and Sousa Martins families, he also persecuted political adversaries. His government suffered with political instability, the bankruptcy of the state, the Great Draught of 1915 and the effects of the World War I. On 6 January 1913, Firmino reformed his post as Marshal.

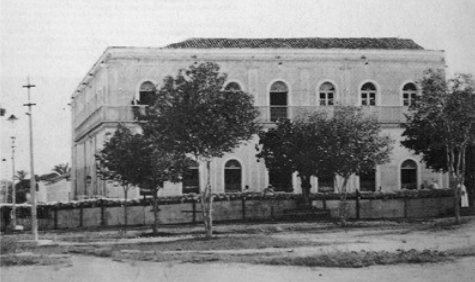
The fortified Governors Palace in 1919

In 1915, Firmino and Félix Pacheco organized a campaign against Miguel Rosa reelection in Rio de Janeiro. The campaign was also supported by Antonio Freire. As a result, Eurípedes Clementino de Aguiar won. Eurípedes won for a small difference, and Miguel didn't recognize the change of the government. Eurípedes supporters marched to Teresina to force the change and Miguel fortified the Government Palace, fearing an armed fight. The local population fled to Flores do Piauí. but Félix Pacheco got an habeas corpus from the Supreme Federal Court (STF) to reaccept the Congressmen tied to Eurípedes in the Chamber of Deputies. They came back to their roles and recognized Eurípedes as Governor.

=== Pachequismo ===
From there on, the ideas of Félix Pacheco, an allied of the Pires Ferreira, became predominant, what came to be known as "pachequismo". Félix then supported his brother, João Luís Ferreira in the next elections for Governor. The Pires Ferreiras wanted to elect a Governor of their own and they entered in a quarrel with Félix, but they gave up. Firmino's term as Senator ended in 1921, as he was not reelected. He contested his defeat, affirming that Félix should have his political rights revoked for having accepted a commendation from the King of Belgium Albert I, a crime according to the constitution. The case was closed by unanimity by the STF on 21 April 1921, as it was decided the "recognition of powers" was beyond the jurisprudence of the court.

Pachequismo lasted for two governments, from João Luís Ferreira and Matias Olímpio de Melo. Melo's government was marked by a raise in violence in the state, as he had to fight cangaceiros and the Coluna Prestes. In 1927, the federal judge Lucrécio Dantas Avelino was murdered in his own house, and the opposition accused Melo to be the responsible, and Melo accused Eurípedes of the crime. Fernando used the instability of pachequismo and the support of the president Washington Luís, as his grandchild, Firmino Pires de Mello, was married to the presidents daughter, to be elected as a Senator. Félix won the election, but Fernando contested on STF and was elected instead, with Félix becoming ineligible.

The structure of power change once again, and Melo was obligated to colligate with Fernando, that supported João de Deus Pires Leal as governor. When João won the elections, his government began to substitute political opponents from the public machine. João de Deus also interfered directly in the elections, when he supported the election of José Pires Ferreira Neto to the Legislative Assembly of Piauí.

== Death ==
Firmino was elected for another term as Senator in 1930, but he died On 21 July, creating a vacuum of power on Piauí politics. Shortly after, Getúlio Vargas came to power, and his house was searched for the secret archives of Firmino and Washington Luís. The documents vanished afterwards, never to be found again. In Piauí, João de Deus was deposed and Matias Olímpio came to power. The Pires Ferreira were persecuted and eventually Firmino was forgotten from Piauí history.

== Personal life ==
Firmino married with his cousin, Lina Pires Ferreira, on Engenho Paraíso, São Bernardo, on 15 November 1875. The party lasted for two days, and his slaves were part of the festivities. They had three children, Lina Pires Ferreira, Maria Pires Ferreira and Julieta Pires Ferreira.

In Rio de Janeiro, he lived at Cosme Velho. He was such a receptive personality that the U-shaped staircases from Rio were known as "Pires Ferreira Stairs". On the other hand, he was very authoritarian in Piauí.

He was nicknamed "Angry Cow" by Floriano Peixoto and "Pifer Senator" during his time as a politician.

== Cultural impact ==
Firmino was parodied by Osório Duque-Estrada on História do Brasil Pelo Método Confuso (1917) and José Madeira de Freitas on Feira Livre (1923).

There is a street in Teresina calles Firmino Pires.

A monument was built in homage of Firmino Pires Ferreira at Praça da Matriz, Barras. A school at Praça da Bonelle, Pedro II, was named Marechal Pires Ferreira.

== Distinctions ==
- Order of Avis
- Order of the Southern Cross
- Golden Medal (Brazil)
- Golden Medal (Argentina)
- Golden Medal (Uruguay)
