= Mariana Crioula =

Brazilian-born slave (fl. 1838)

- Born: c. 1808; State of Brazil

Mariana Crioula (born c. 1808) was an enslaved Black woman in Brazil in the mid-19th century who became a symbol of resistance to slavery in Brazil.

== Biography ==
Mariana was the seamstress and maid of Francisca Elisa Xavier, wife of Portuguese-Brazilian captain major Manuel Francisco Xavier. She was at one point married to José, another enslaved person who was forced to work in the fields.

She was one of the leaders of a massive revolt against the Brazilian Empire in 1838 that helped to free around 400 other enslaved people in the Vale do Café region of Rio de Janeiro province. The revolt was led by both Mariana and Manuel Congo, who was at that point Mariana's companion, with both being named by fellow enslaved people as King and Queen. She was responsible for helping the women, children, and elderly escape. She was about 30 years old by that point.

The revolt was very successful, as 300 of the around 400 that were freed were able to escape. Those who escaped eventually reunited to participate in the rebellion. In response, the Brazilian National Guard was called in a contingent of 180 men led by then-Coronel Luís Alves de Lima e Silva. They captured Mariana and 15 other enslaved people, though they were acquitted. Mariana, however, was forced to watch the execution of Manuel Congo.

== Legacy ==
On 24 February 2011, the state government of Rio de Janeiro recognized Mariana Crioula as a heroine of the state.

A biography about her was written by author Jarid Arraes as part of her 2015 cordel collection and book Heroínas Negras Brasileiras em 15 cordéis.

In 2021, the Mariana Crioula exhibition room was opened in the city of Vassouras, Rio de Janeiro. Later that year, a play about her life and the rebellion premiered in Paty do Alferes, Rio de Janeiro.
