= Manuel Francisco Xavier =

Brazilian plantation owner (died 1840)

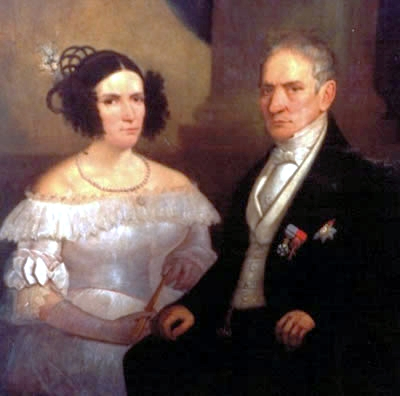
- A portrait of Manuel Francisco Xavier and his wife Francisca Elisa
- Born: Faial Island, Portuguese Empire
- Died: 1840; Paty do Alferes, Empire of Brazil
- Spouse: Francisca Elisa Xavier

Captain-major Manuel Francisco Xavier (died 1840) was a Portuguese-born Brazilian plantation owner. He, along with his wife Francisca Elisa Xavier, were wealthy land owners in the Vale do Paraíba region of what is now the state of Rio de Janeiro. These included the Freguesia (currently Aldeia de Arcozelo), Maravilha and Santa Tereza plantations, along with Cachoeira farm. The largest slave revolt in the region, led by Manuel Congo and Mariana Crioula, occurred on the plantations they owned.

== Biography ==
In 1804, he married Francisca Elisa. According to coronel Francisco Peixoto de Lacerda Vernek, Xavier was inconsistent in his treatment of the people he enslaved, at points being lenient, at other points extremely severe. An inventory made of Xavier's property, made in 1840 and two years after Manuel Congo revolted, counted 449 enslaved people, 85% of whom were men and 80% were African.

During the course of the rebellion, Xavier had asked for help from a local squire from the freguesia of Nossa Senhora da Conceição do Paty do Alferes, lieutenant coronel José Pinheiro de Souza Vernek, though was not successful. He had already had a prolonged political conflict with sergeant-major and later padre Inácio de Sousa Vernek, the grandfather of José Pinheiro de Souza Vernek and chief colonel of the 13th Legion of the National Guard Francisco Peixoto de Lacerda Vernek.

The revolt was very successful, as 300 of the around 400 that were freed were able to escape. Those who escaped eventually reunited to participate in the rebellion. In response, the Brazilian National Guard was called in a contingent of 180 men led by then-Coronel Luís Alves de Lima e Silva. They captured Mariana and 15 other enslaved people, though they were acquitted. Mariana, however, was forced to watch the execution of Manuel Congo.

Xavier died in 1840 in Paty do Alferes.

== See also ==
- Manuel Congo
- Mariana Crioula
- Francisca Elisa Xavier

== Bibliography ==
- RAPOSO, Ignacio. Historia de Vassouras. Vassouras: Fundação 1º de Maio, 1935.
- SCISÍNIO, Alaôr Eduardo. Dicionário da Escravidão. Rio de Janeiro: Léo Christiano Editorial Ltda, 1997.
- GOMES, Flávio dos Santos. Histórias de Quilombolas. São Paulo: Companhia das Letras, 2006.
- SOUZA, Alan de Carvalho. Terras e Escravos: A desordem senhorial no Vale do Paraíba. Jundiaí, Paco Editorial: 2012.
