= Edgardo Pires Ferreira =

- Born: February 8, 1937 (age 89); Teresópolis, Rio de Janeiro
- Education: Pontifical Catholic University of Rio de Janeiro; Louvre Museum; Albright Institute of Archaeological Research; University of Michigan
- Occupations: sociologist, museologist, archeologist, zooarchaeologist and genealogist
- Notable work: A Mística do Parentesco
- Spouse: Marianne Ramira Ligeti
- Parents: João Antônio Pires Ferreira (father); Henriqueta de Carvalho Sanmartin (mother)
- Family: Pires Ferreira

Edgardo Pires Ferreira (born February 8, 1937) is a Brazilian sociologist, museologist, archeologist, zooarchaeologist and genealogist.

== Graduation ==
Pires Ferreira graduated in sociology by the Pontifical Catholic University of Rio de Janeiro, museology by the Louvre Museum, archeology by the Albright Institute of Archaeological Research and zooarchaeology by the University of Michigan.

== Work ==
=== Archeology ===
Pires Ferreira was part of archeological missions to Israel and Iran for the French National Centre for Scientific Research. Amongst his contributions to the Museum of Archeology and Ethnology of the University of São Paulo are 12 items from Elam (1971–1972), 231 objects from Iran, Israel, Egypt, Jordan and Tunisia (1973) and Mediterranean items (1987).

In the 70s, Pires Ferreira went to Mexico, Peru and Ecuador for the University of Michigan. There, he helped conduct zooarchaeological studies about camelids, and he theorized sedentism happened in the region due to hunt of the local species. He, Wheler Pires and Ramiro Matos Mendieta helped create the laboratories of paleoethnobotany and paleozoology and the national archeology program from the National University of San Marcos.

=== Genealogy ===
Pires Ferreira is also known in the field of genealogy. His interest on the field began in 1981, when he returned to Brazil after working for the University of Michigan. He found several documents from his grandfather, Fernando Pires Ferreira Filho, and got interested for the usefulness of genealogy on Brazil's history. His work was encouraged by the History department of University of São Paulo, and he finished compiling his first book of the Pires Ferreira family in four years. His book is called A Mística do Parentesco: Uma Genealogia Inacabada: Domingos Pires Ferreira e Sua Descendência and it is currently on the 6th volume. The 5th volume, A Mística do Parentesco: Os Castello Branco e Seus Entrelaçamentos Familiares: Francisco da Cunha Castello Branco e Sua Descendência (2008), is a work about the Castello Branco family. He categorized more than 36 thousand family members from Pires Ferreira and Castello Branco families and his work is considered a reference for historical and genealogical studies.

He is a corresponding partner from the Historical, Geographical and Genealogical Institute of Sorocaba and a full member of the Brazilian College of Genealogy since July 1988, where he occupies the chair no. 8.

=== Other contributions ===
Pires Ferreira has also contributed to the book A Literatura de Barras do Marataoã (2023), from Nelson Nery, and donated correspondences from Renina Katz, Anna Letycia, Thereza Mirand and Lena Cecilia Bergstein for the Pontifical Catholic University of Ecuador.

He was also the president of São Paulo Biennial Foundation from 1992 to 1994. Afterwards, he worked as a counselor, but he and other 5 people renounced on 27 June 2000, as, according to them, in practice the foundation was controlled by only four people.
