= Igara (canoe) =

Igara or iara is a dugout canoe. It was used by Native Brazilians and Native Peruvians to navigate through igarapés in the Amazon basin since pre-Cabraline times, and it still is a common vessel in the region. Modern igaras have changed their design, and it is not uncommon to see the vessel being built with planks and pieces of wood, instead of being carved on a trunk.

== Etymology ==
The word "igara" comes from Tupi-Guarani, meaning a "wood" or "plank canoe". The word is also found in Cocama, and in Omagua the vessel is known as "iara". It was incorporated into the General Language and later to Portuguese.

The word is combined for naming other types of vessels, such as the motorized boats "igarité" and "igaritéasu", and "igarapés", the small rivers from the Amazon basin (pathways of the canoe). Amongst the proper nouns derived from "igara" are the cities of Igarassu, Igaraçu do Tietê, Igarapava, Igaratá Icapuí, Igarapé-Miri and Igaratinga.

== Description ==
An igara is a type of dugout canoe that was used by Native Brazilians and Native Peruvians since pre-Cabraline times. It is defined as "a vessel excavated in a single trunk (monoxyl) with an approximate elyptical shape, being shallow, flat-bottomed, and upright at the stern". It differs from other canoes by its size. An igara is smaller than a bũgu. It is used to navigate through shallow waters. The navigation is done through the bow to help with the stability. It can be moved by a paddle called "yapuki" by the Kokamas and Omaguas or "zinga" by the Tremembés, but a sail can also be added.

It takes about one hour to manufacture an igara. The trunks were usually of several types of local trees, specially the ones that it naturally curves on the extremities. They were called a "yaka-yaka" (tree that floats) when it was cut down for this purpose. Some examples are bertholletia excelsa, mezilaurus itauba, laurus nobilis and cedrus. Fire is often used to help with the sculpting process.

On the Kokama and Omagua cultures, the construction of an iara is often done between August and September. In the end of the process, the community unite to sing "icaros" while smoking a mapacho cigarette.

With time, their design have changed, integrating nails, rafters, beams, tow and canvas. It is not uncommon to see the vessel being built only with pieces of wood, instead of carved on a trunk.

The variations of igara differ from their size. Smaller vessels are called "igaramirim", while bigger vessels are called "igarasu".
