= Fazenda =

16th- to 18th-century Brazilian plantation

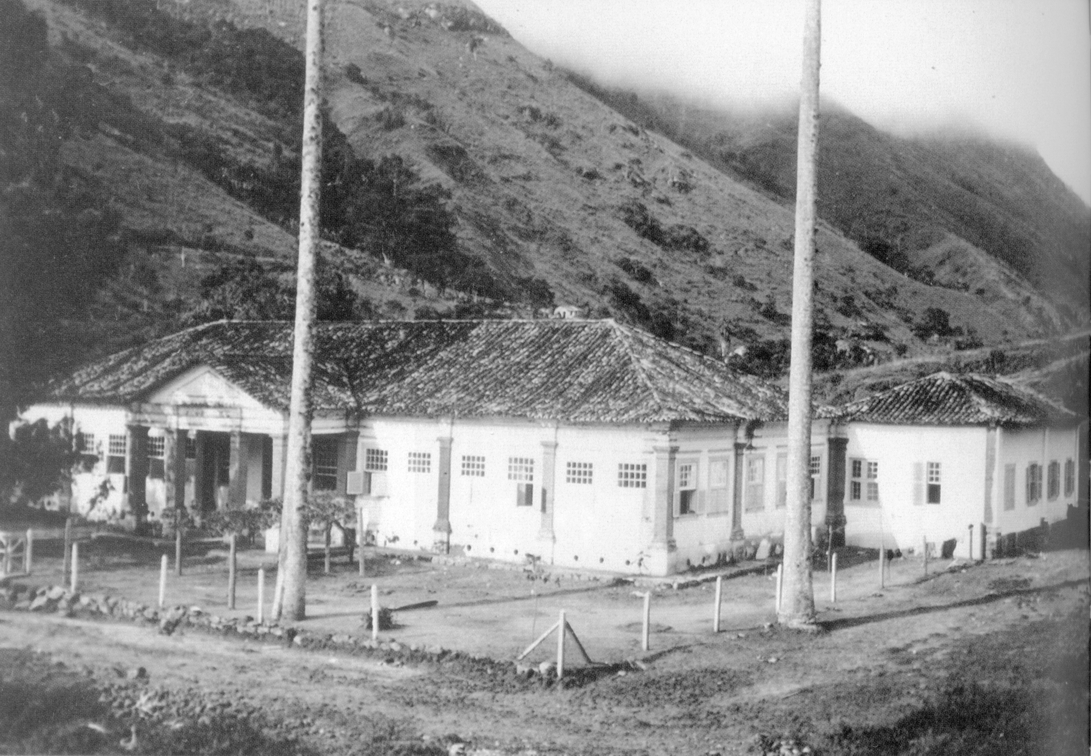
Piedade farm. The master's house of a coffee plantation founded in the 18th century in Paty do Alferes in the Province (now state) of Rio de Janeiro

A fazenda (Portuguese pronunciation: [fɐˈzẽdɐ, fa-]) is a plantation found throughout Brazil during the colonial period (16th–18th centuries). They were concentrated primarily in the northeastern region, where sugar was produced in the engenhos, expanding during the 19th century in the southeastern region to coffee production. Nowadays fazenda denotes any kind of farm in Brazilian Portuguese and occasionally in other Portuguese varieties as well.

Fazendas created major export commodities for Brazilian trade, but also led to intensification of slavery in Brazil. Coffee provided a new basis for agricultural expansion in southern Brazil. In the provinces of Rio de Janeiro and then São Paulo, coffee estates, or fazendas, began to spread toward the interior as new lands were opened. By 1850 coffee made up more than 50% of Brazil's exports, which amounted to more than half of the world's coffee production.

Along with the expansion of coffee growing came an intensification of slavery as the country's primary form of labor. More than 1.4 million Africans were forced into slavery in Brazil in the last 50 years of the slave trade, and even after the trans-Atlantic slave trade ended, slavery continued in the country until 1888, when it was abolished by the so-called Golden Law.

Because of the increased profit from the coffee trade, the years after 1850 saw considerable growth and prosperity in Brazil. Railroads, steamships and telegraph lines were introduced in Brazil, all paid for by the money the fazendas supplied from their coffee crop. In growing cities such as Rio de Janeiro and São Paulo, a middle class consisting of merchants, lawyers and an urban working class grew, once again, paid for by the money coming from the fazendas.

== Modern forced labour practices ==
More than 130 years after the end of slavery, forced labour practices in Brazil still occur in both rural and urban areas, mainly through debt bondage schemes. In rural areas, workers are detained on farms until they pay their debts, which are often fraudulently incurred. Their identity documents and work permits are often seized by the employer. They are often under surveillance of armed guards. Those who protest are physically threatened; if they try to escape, they may be killed.

== See also ==
- Coffee cycle
- Hacienda
