= Joaquim Pires =

Coordinates: 3°31′S 42°12′W

- Municipality
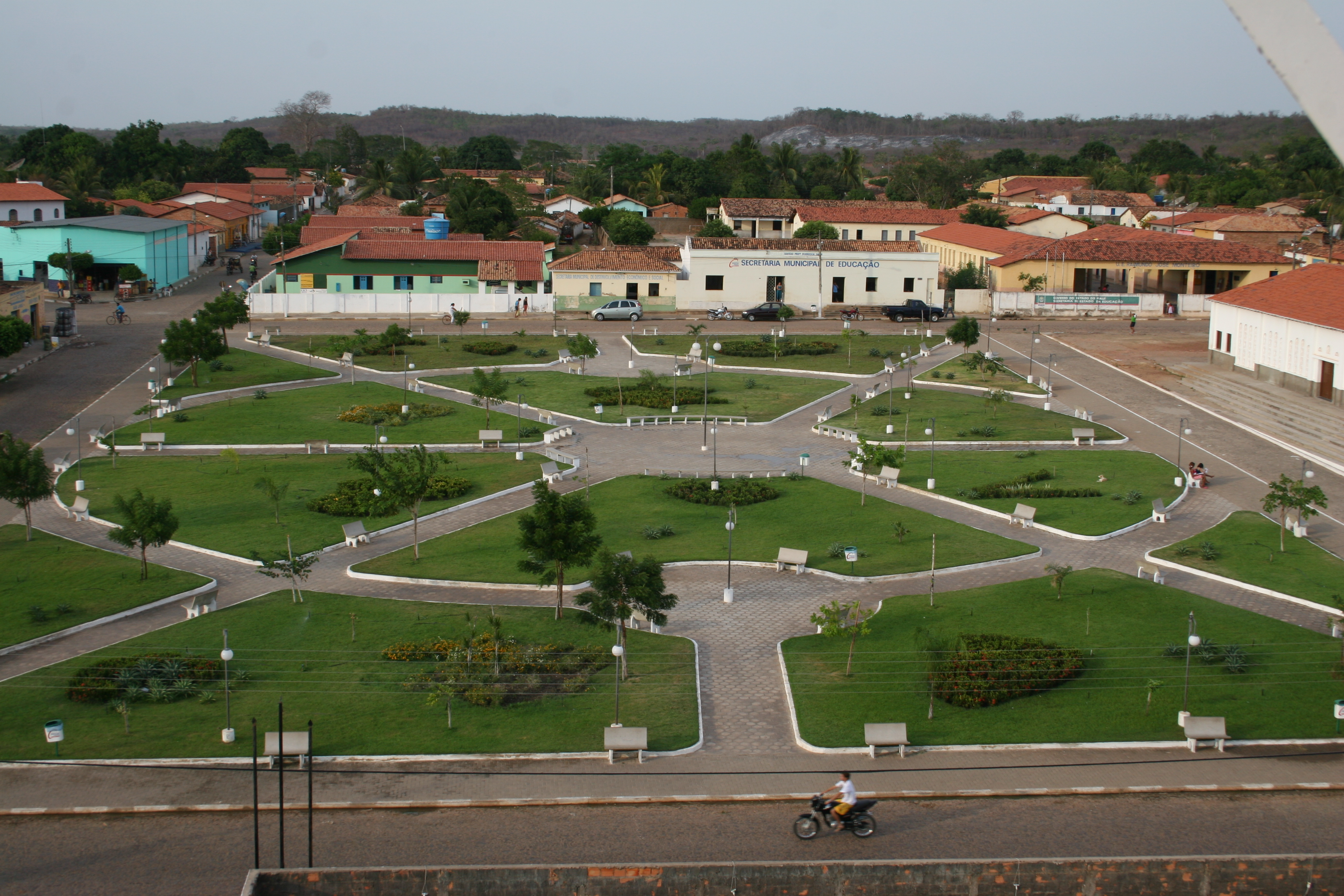

- Country: Brazil
- Region: Nordeste
- State: Piauí
- Mesoregion: Norte Piauiense

Population (2020)
  - Total: 14,376
- Time zone: UTC−3 (BRT)

Joaquim Pires is a municipality in the state of Piauí in the Northeast region of Brazil.

== See also ==
- List of municipalities in Piauí
