= Magalhães de Almeida =

- Municipality
- Location of Magalhães de Almeida in the Nordeste Region

- Location in Brazil
- Coordinates: 3°24′S 42°12′W
- Country: Brazil
- Region: Nordeste
- State: Maranhão
- Mesoregion: Leste Maranhense
- Established: October 1, 1952

Government
  - Mayor: Raimundo Nonato Carvalho

Area
  - Total: 167,237 sq mi (433,141 km^{2})

Population (2022)
  - Total: 13,807
  - Density: 82.3/sq mi (31.78/km^{2})
- Demonym: Magalhense
- Time zone: UTC−3 (BRT)

Magalhães de Almeida is a municipality in the state of Maranhão in the Northeast region of Brazil.

== History ==
Around 1855, there was a great flood on Parnaíba River, and Barnabé Pereira Mascarenhas went down the river with an igara looking for new lands to live in. He found a hill on the left side of the river and built his new home there.

Returning to his old settlement, people asked Barnabé where he had stablished himself, and he answered he made a "hole" (furo in Portuguese) nearby. The region, thus, was known as Furo.

In 1885, Antônio da Silva Lopes, Militão Pereira Mascarenhas and Florindo José da Silva tried to colonize the region, but failed. Furo only developed in 1918, when Benedito Romão de Sousa, Manoel Vasconcelos Leão, Vítor Gonçalves Costa and others moved to the region and built infrastructure, including a church. The region then was renamed Porto de Santo Antônio, as a homage to Anthony of Padua. The region was predominantly occupied by fishermen.

In April 1925, the region was elevated to the status of village by the Governor José Maria Magalhães de Almeida. In 1936, it became the district of Trincheiras, from São Bernardo. During the term of the Governor Sebastião Archer da Silva, it became a municipality through the Law nº 771, from 1 October 1952, that came into effect on 1 January 1953.

From 1996 on, with the election of João Cândido de Carvalho Neto as mayor, the municipality was predominantly governed by the Carvalho family.

== Geography ==
Magalhães de Almeida is located on the Mesoregion of Leste Maranhense and the Microregion of Baixo Parnaíba Maranhense. It's predominant biomes are Cerrado (77%) and Caatinga (23%). The municipality has a tropical sub-humid dry climate, with two seasons: rainy (from January to June) and dry (from July to December). The vegetation is predominantly made of savanna and seasonal tropical forest.

=== Hidrography ===
Magalhães de Almeida is bathed by the Parnaíba and Buriti Rivers. Both rivers are connected through the Buriti Lagoon. The underground water comes from the porous aquifer of Grupo Barreiras and unconsolidated sediments from swamps and mangrove deposits, continental wind deposits and alluvial deposits.

Floods are common during the rainy season, isolating some villages and difficulting access to some places, including touristic spots.

=== Geology ===
Magalhães de Almeida is constituted of Paleogene detritolateritic layers, Pleistocene Aeolian layers, and alluvial deposits from Holocene.

It's geomorphology is made of river plains, plateaus from Parnaíba River, and sub-littoral tablelands. The soil is made out of latosols, neosols and plinthosols.

== Demographics ==
=== Population ===
According to IBGE, the population in 2022 was of 13,807, a decline of 21.49% since the last census in 2010.

=== Public safety ===
During the 80s, public safety on Magalhães de Almeida and other 28 municipalities was the responsibility of the 3rd. Company (CIA) of the Military Police from the 2nd. Military Police Battalion, headquartered in Chapadinha. It was made out of one captain, one sergeant, one 3rd. corporal and 15 soldiers.

Since the State Law nº 4,716, from 17 April 1986, CIA became independent, being renamed to 4th. Company of Independent Military Police (CI). CI was responsible for 28 municipalities, and added 112 soldiers in 1993.

CI was extinguished and substituted by the 6th Battalion of Military Police through the State Law nº 10,155, from 29 October 2014, responsible for 17 municipalities. Four of the municipalities were passed to another battalion through the State Law nº 11,813, from 24 August 2022. Magalhães de Almeida, Santana do Maranhão and São Bernardo are the resonsibility of the 2nd. CIA.

In 2023, the military police had a base rented by the prefecture, where 9 policemen were allocated. The patrols were mostly made with motorcycles.

== Urban infrastructure ==
=== Roads ===
Magalhães de Almeida can be reached from MA 110 Road. Its main Avenues are Bendito Romão de Sousa and Getúlio Vargas. According to a 2021 study by the Federal University of Maranhão, the roads are full of holes.

== Economy ==
According to IBGE, the GDP per capita from Magalhães de Almeida was of R$ 13,150.33 (2023) with an HDI of 0.567 (2010). In 2020, the biggest economic sector from the municipality was services, followed by agriculture.

In 2021, the average earning of the municipality was of 1.5 minimum wages, with 58.1% of the population earning up until half a minimum wage. The total amount of 1,843 people had formal jobs.

There has been incidences of work analogous to slavery in the municipality. Between 13 and 27 August 2025, tax auditors rescued 76 people working with carnauba straw extraction after an operation from the Federal Police with the Public Prosecutor's Office and the Federal Public Defender's Office.

=== Agriculture ===
Most of the agricultural activity in Magalhães de Almeida is for subsistence, with cassava being the main product. It is mainly harvested by Trincheiras village and used to produce flour and sold to Ambev. The municipality is also part of the "New Agricultural Frontier", regions in Maranhão that are prone to mechanized agriculture. It is used to plant soybean and millet for exportation purposes.

Temporary plantations are used to produce cassava, soy, millet, beans, rice, watermelon and corn. Permanent plantations are used to produce papaya, banana Bahia coconut, cashew nuts and mango. Horticulture is also present on the municipality, with the predominance of chives and coriander. In 2024, there were 99 permanent plantations and 676 temporary ones, occupying 615 ha.

== Government ==
=== Districts ===
Magalhães de Almeida is subdivided in two districts, Magalhães de Lima and Custódio Lima. Besides the city of Magalhães de Almeida, the municipality is also home of the villages of Alto do Cedro, Aninga, Bacuri, Baixa da Salsa, Boa Vista, Curralinho, Custódio Lima, Entre Ladeiras, Férias, Florzinho, Malhadinha, Melancias, Murici dos Bragas, Nova Vila, Oitis, Santa Maria, Santo Inácio, Tourada, Trincheiras and Vargem Grande and the settlement projects of Canaã and Santo Agostinho.

=== List of mayors ===
Mayors of Magalhães de Almeida
name	term	party	vice-mayor	notes	reference
Captain Arlindo Faray	1953			His term lasted for 23 days	
Benedito Romão de Sousa	1953–1983				
Francisco das Chagas Silva Castro	1984–1996				
João Cândido Carvalho Neto	1997–2000			First term	
João Cândido Carvalho Neto	2001–2004			Second term	
Osvaldo Batista Vieira Filho	2005–2008	PMDB	Camilo Gonçalves Costa		
João Cândido Carvalho Neto	2009–2012	PMDB	Bernardo da Silva Costa	Third term	
João Cândido Carvalho Neto	2013–2016	PMDB	Tadeu de Jesus Batista de Sousa	Fourth term	
Tadeu de Jesus Batista de Sousa	2017–2020	PMDB	Francisco das Chagas Batista Vieira		
Raimundo Nonato Carvalho	2021–2024	MDB	Rafael Santos da Silva	First term	
Raimundo Nonato Carvalho	2025–	PDT	Rafael Santos da Silva	Second term	

== See also ==
- List of municipalities in Maranhão
