= Buriti dos Lopes =

Coordinates: 3°10′S 41°52′W

- Municipality
- Nickname: Cidade do Arroz
- Country: Brazil
- Region: Nordeste
- State: Piauí
- Mesoregion: Norte Piauiense

Government
  - Mayor: Laura Rosa (Progressistas)

Population (2020)
  - Total: 19,807
- Time zone: UTC−3 (BRT)

Buriti dos Lopes is a municipality in the state of Piauí in the Northeast region of Brazil.

The municipality contains part of the 1,592,550-hectare (3,935,300-acre) Serra da Ibiapaba Environmental Protection Area, created

== History ==
It was founded over 200 years ago by the Portuguese Francisco Lopes, the first inhabitant to settle on the banks of the Buriti stream, a name given to it due to the native buriti palm groves. The toponym resulted from the association of the name of the stream with the surname "Lopes" of its founder. Francisco Lopes died in the fight against the balaios in 1839, at the age of 90, on his Tinguis farm. This event sparked a popular revolt, resulting in the organization of a mixed force of cavalry and infantry under the command of the mayor of Parnaíba, Lieutenant Colonel José Francisco de Miranda Osório, to fight the rebels. The contingent dissolved the group, which was in Barra do Longá. The town was elevated to the category of town on August 2, 1890, by act of the then Governor, Dr. Joaquim Nogueira Paranaguá. In 1907, the name Buriti dos Lopes was changed to Vila do Baixo Longá, returning to its original toponym in 1911. In 1931, the municipality was extinguished and its territory was incorporated into that of Parnaíba, until 1933, when its autonomy was restored.

== See also ==
- List of municipalities in Piauí
