= Casa-grande =

Main house of Brazilian plantations

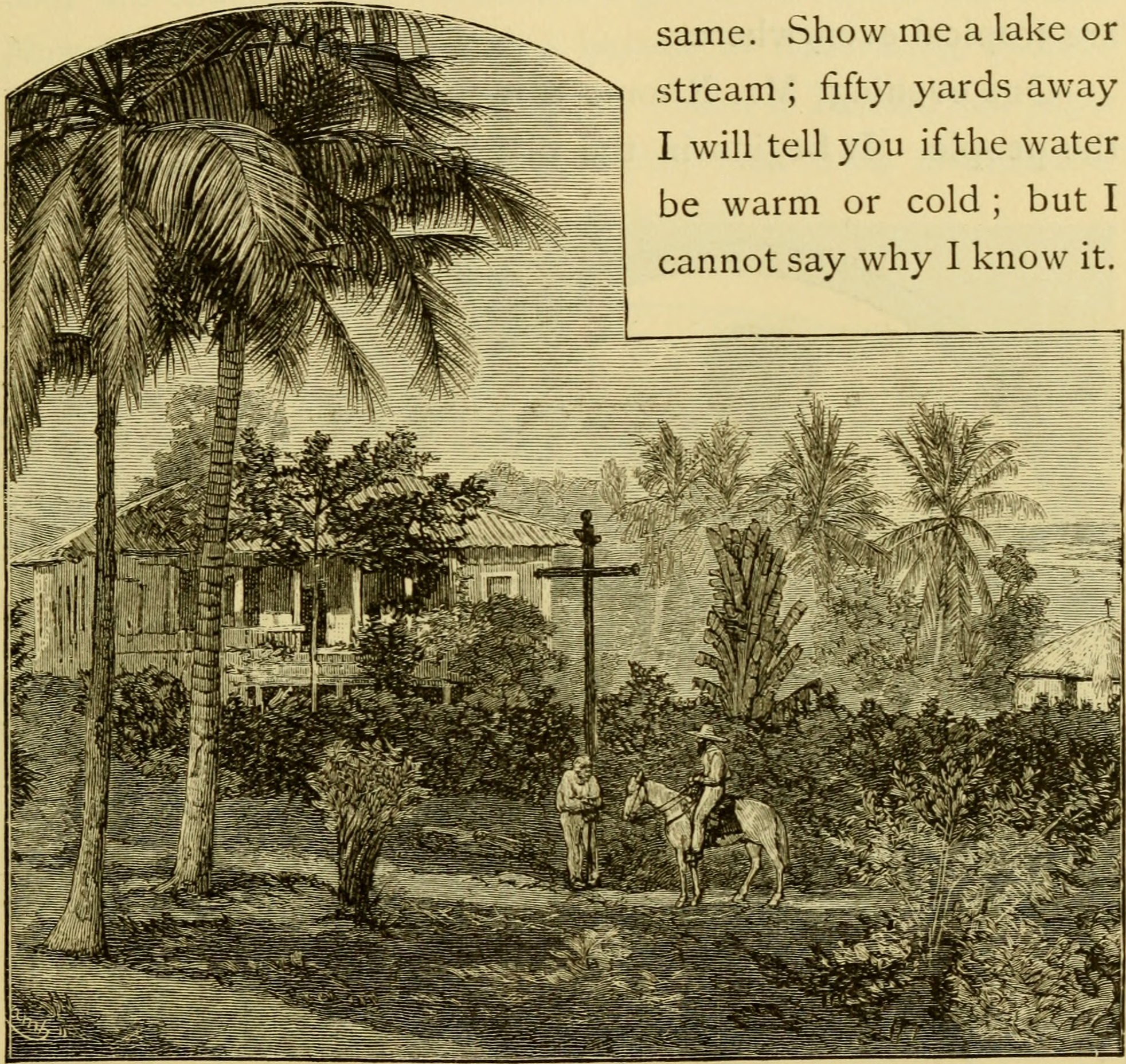
The casa-grande of a tobacco farm in Brazil (Brazil, the Amazons and the coast) by Herbert Huntingdon Smith

The casa-grande (Portuguese for "big house") is the Brazilian equivalent of a plantation house. These casas-grandes were predominantly located in the northeast of Brazil (areas such as present day Bahia and Pernambuco). Additionally, sugar cane was grown in the interior, in the states of São Paulo and Rio de Janeiro.

The casa-grande was made up of three main components: the Big House, the senzala (slave quarters), and the engenho (sugar cane mill). The Lord of sugar plantation was called the senhor de engenho ("Lord of the sugar plantation"). His word was final, and he had control over the land, the slaves, and the women who made up the plantation community.

The larger casas-grandes were self-sustaining, since they were isolated from the more developed coastal regions. Essential structures that were built included the school, the nursery, the infirmary, the family chapel, the lords’s harem, the bank, and the cemetery. In the early days it was necessary to maintain an army on the plantation. Those armies were sometimes very large, having up to one hundred members drawn from Indigenous or multi-racial residents.

These plantations constituted a largely self-contained economic, social, political, and cultural system.

== Master of sugar works ==
Gilberto Freyre wrote in his book Casa-Grande & Senzala, "Once the Jesuit was overthrown the senhor de engenho dominated colonial life almost without interference. He was the true master of Brazil, more powerful than viceroys or bishops." He added, "The truth is that around these senhores de engenho was created the most stable type of civilization in Hispanic America; and that type of civilization is exemplified by the heavy-set, horizontal architecture of the Big House."

These land owners were usually very powerful Portuguese men, and they did their best to keep their blood pure. This of course meant heavy inbreeding to keep the aristocracy. Freyre also says in his book that their motto was " A white woman to marry, a mulatto to take to bed, a Negress to do the work."

These sugar cane plantations were somewhat similar to the larger Southern plantations in the U.S., being an agricultural industry run on slave labor, which became very powerful in both Brazil and the United States.

== See also ==
- History of slavery in Brazil
- Plantation economy
- Sugar plantations in the Caribbean
- House Negro
- Fazenda
