= Engenho =

Portuguese term for a sugar cane mill

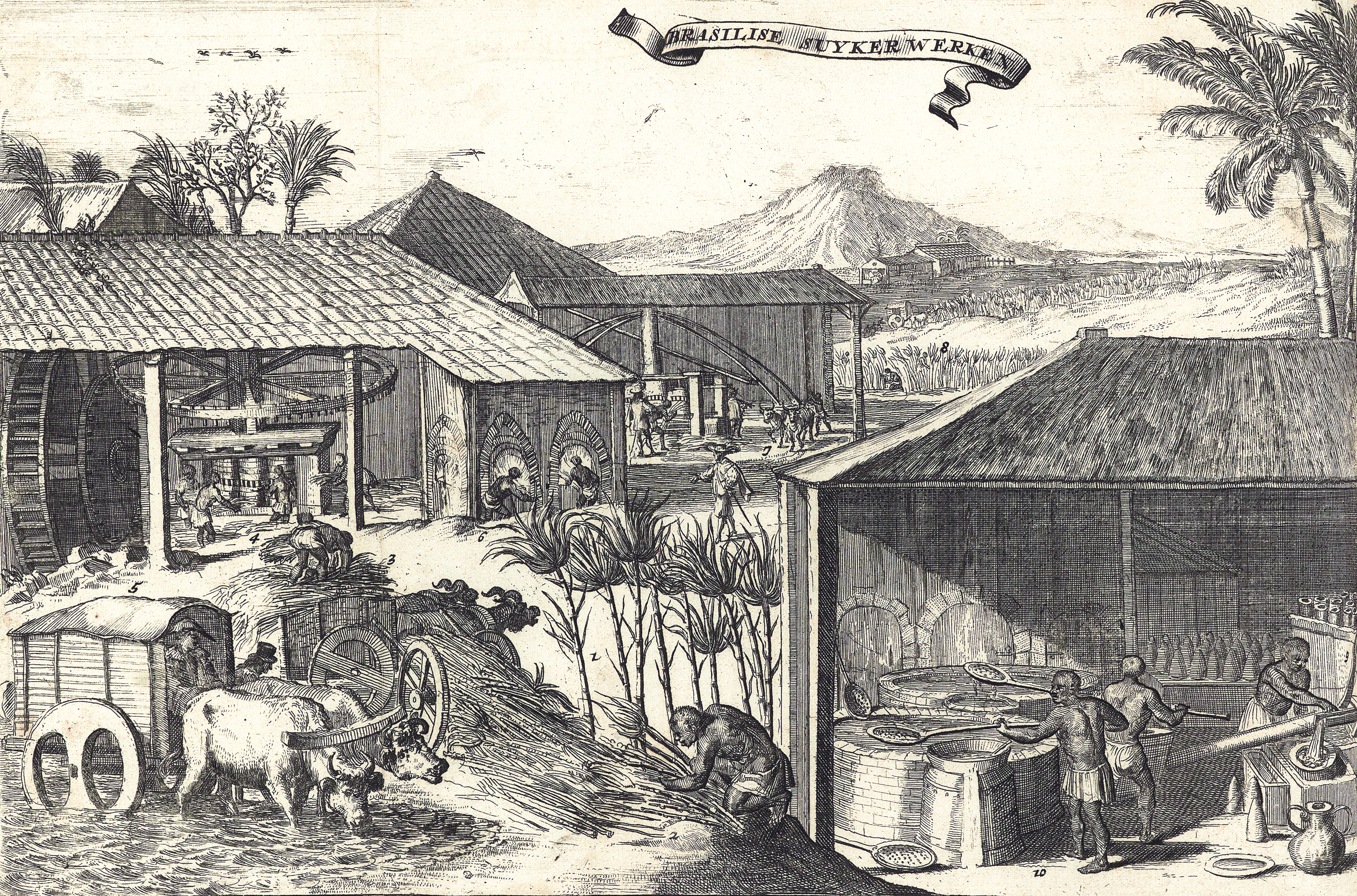
Engenho in Brazil in the 16th century

Engenho (Portuguese pronunciation: [ẽˈʒẽɲu]) is a colonial-era Portuguese term for a sugar cane mill and the associated facilities. In Spanish-speaking countries such as Cuba and Puerto Rico, they are called ingenios. Both words mean engine (from latin ingenium). The word engenho usually only referred to the mill, but it could also describe the area as a whole including land, a mill, the people who farmed and who had a knowledge of sugar production, and a crop of sugar cane. A large estate was required because of the massive amount of labor needed to yield refined sugar, molasses, or rum from raw sugar cane. These estates were prevalent in Brazil, Cuba, Dominican Republic, and other countries in the Caribbean. Today, Brazil is still one of the world's major producers of sugar. Sugarcane cultivation has resulted in deforestation and environmental devastation of Brazil's Atlantic Forest since the onset of colonization.

== Sugarcane in Brazil ==
Sugarcane was not introduced to Brazil until the Portuguese established the production of it in the middle of the 16th century. They controlled the leading sugar industry in Madeira already, but they wanted to gain another powerhouse production base in Brazil. To start out, the crop was grown and produced by the indigenous people of the land for traded goods. That relationship evolved from trade to slavery of the indigenous population. Many places in the world had begun to substitute sugar for honey as a major commodity due to the supply increase and lower prices. Sugar became a luxury item on the world market because of it exploited coerced labor demand and the industrial organization that were both imperative to production. The native population were not really adhering to the slavery aspect and were hard to keep under control, so as the market for sugar grew these factors caused the eventual import of African slaves.

== The Engenho ==
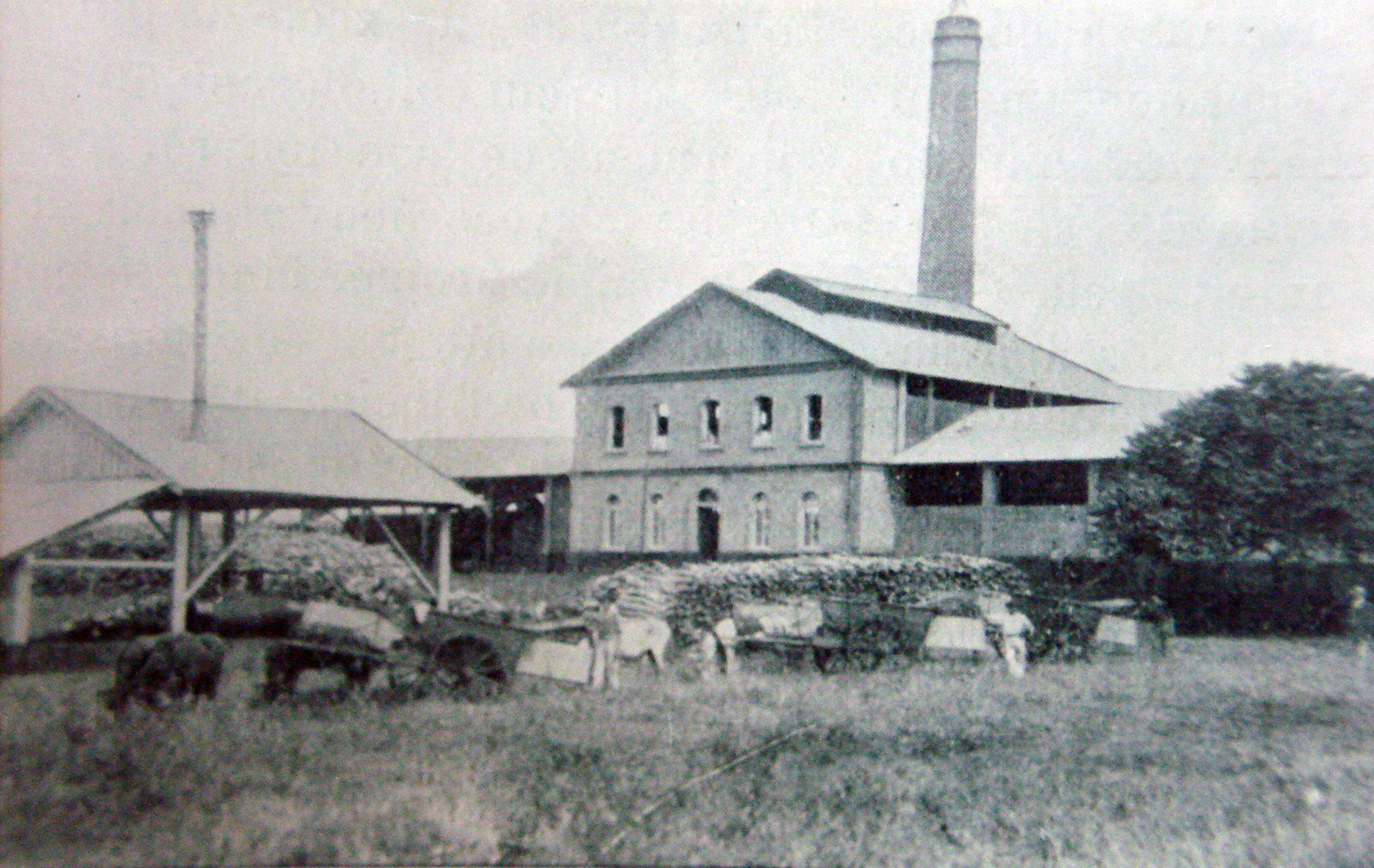
Engenho Central, 1930

The export boom of the late 18th and early 19th century cause a ramp up in the production of sugar and other sugarcane products as well as other resources. The sugar portion of the export boom increased supply until slavery was made illegal in the world. However, the slave trade continued into the latter part of the 19th century. Haiti's slave revolt allowed Brazil among other colonies to become the top producers of the world's sugar. In 1792, Haiti was producing 50% of the sugar on the world market, but after the rebellion they went to producing none the next year. Sugarcane work mainly took place on-site at large plantations called Engenhos. An Engenho is an agricultural establishment as necessary machines and resources for refining sugar from sugarcane. The facilities typically have a mill for milling cane, some cauldrons and distilleries. They acquired the name because of all their components used to produce and develop the sugarcane into potential exports. Engenhos could be considered revolutionary at the time because of its industrial advancement, the work combined manufacturing, chemistry, and agriculture to mass produce sugar. This new industrialized plantation required many working parts to keep it running. An engenho needed a field, workshop, refinery, and office just to produce the sugar. The list did not take account for the needs to power the building or slave requirements and needs. To run the Engenho specialized slaves and servants were necessary. The overseer had to be a free white, while the slaves purchased needed to be strong field hands and some already familiar with the sugar production process. They were sometimes imported from Sao Tome in Africa because of the country's history as major world sugar producers which allowed for the workers from there to already have the artisan skills needed for the sugarcane production. These large sugar plantations required a new division of labor among the overseers and slaves. The overseers had power on the plantation but were not all powerful, the planter was. For example, the overseer could not just punish slaves however he wanted to, he had limitations. His main job was to make sure all the supplies needed where there and to keep a list of what the planter had to get. The overseer was to keep the slaves working and cared for, and also see that the steps in the sugar production were being done correctly. The process needed slaves for cutting, carrying, evaporation, and crystallization all in a compressed time frame due to the nature of the crop. To keep it running and all the parts working in the sugar producing business machine, a dramatic increase of laborers were needed. To make sugar, it was imperative that the sequence was nonstop from the cutting in the field to final export. An error in any stage could bring about drastic effects and ruin a batch of the harvested crop. The sugarcane would become rotten after twenty four hours from being cut, so time was of the essence and the workers could not afford to make mistakes. Production and slave labor could no longer be looked at as separate, they were dependent of one another when it came to the sugarcane cultivation and production. The making and exporting of this commodity was now dependent on the Atlantic slave trade. An aspect that made the engenho a different type of operation was its need of all the people involved from field slave all the way to chief overseer. Each division of labor had to perform and contribute to make the plantation a success. Also, the planter could not buy just any slave to get the job done, they needed to be skilled and knowledgeable about their specific role in the sugarcane process. To achieve the necessary level of knowledge was no easy task. Training cost money, time, and resources. It would take up to a year or more for the sugar production to be learned due to the lengthy amount of time it takes sugarcane to grow and become ripe enough.

== See also ==
- Fazenda
- Trapiche
- Engenho Vitória
