= Paty do Alferes =

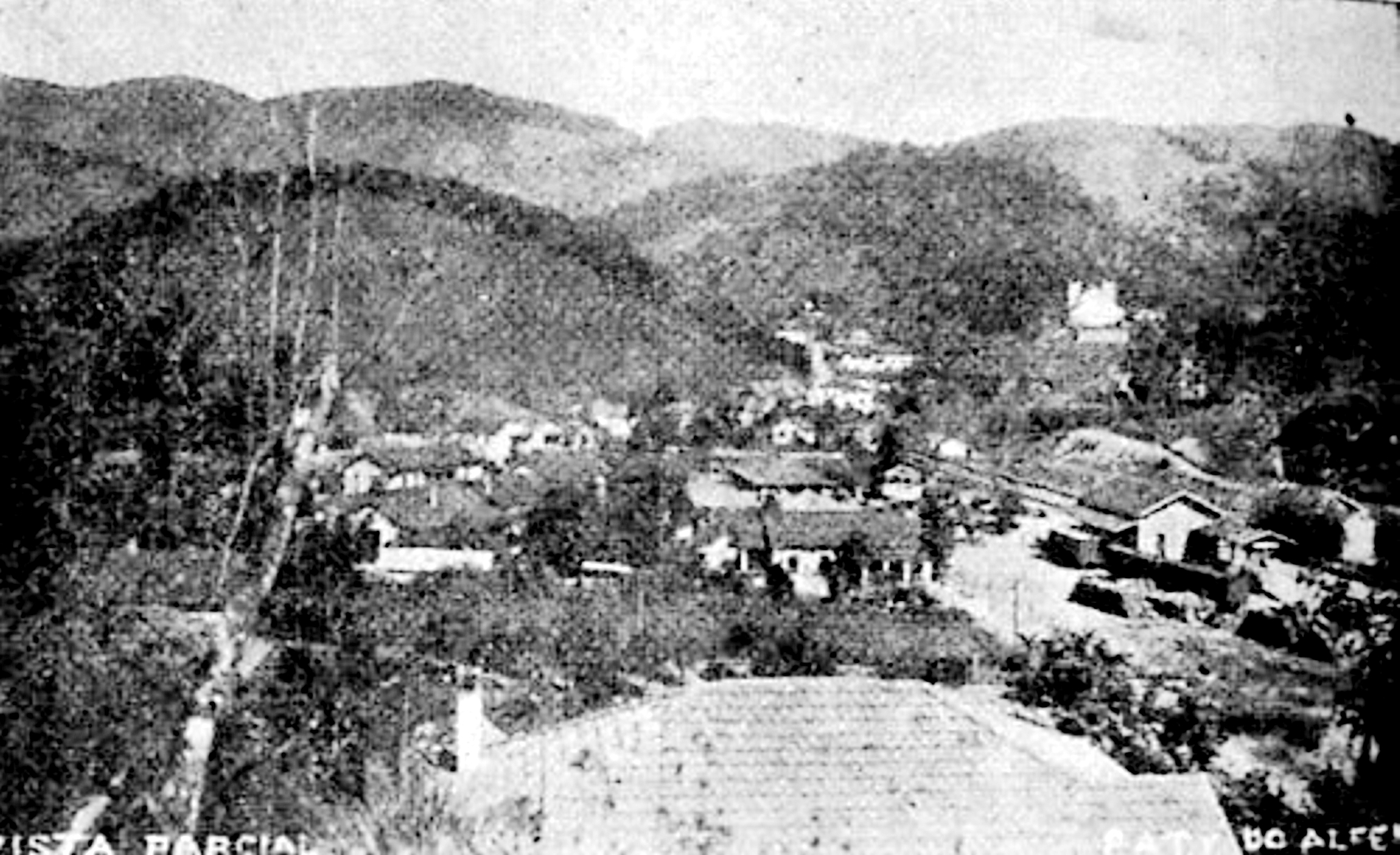

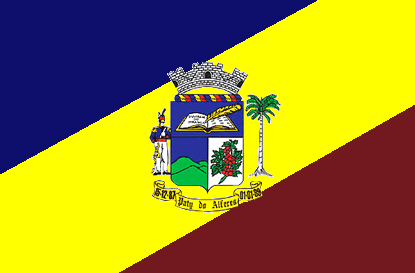
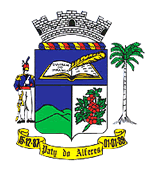
- Flag Coat of arms

- Location of Paty do Alferes in Rio de Janeiro State and Brazil
- Coordinates: 22°25′44″S 43°25′08″W
- Country: Brazil
- Region: Southeast
- State: Rio de Janeiro
- First settlers: 1710
- Freguesia: 1739
- Municipality: December 15, 1988

Government
  - Prefeito (Mayor): Lúcia de Fátima Fernandes Fonseca (until 2008)

Area
  - Total: 319.103 km^{2} (123.206 sq mi)
- Elevation: 610 m (2,000 ft)

Population (2020)
  - Total: 27,858
  - Density: 78.8/km^{2} (204/sq mi)
- Time zone: UTC−3 (BRT)
- Website: www.patydoalferes.rj.gov.br

Paty do Alferes (Portuguese pronunciation: [paˈtʃi dwawˈfɛɾis]) is a municipality located in the Brazilian state of Rio de Janeiro.

== Climate ==
Climate data for Avelar (Paty do Alferes), Rio de Janeiro, elevation 507 m (1,663 ft), (1991–2020)
Month	Jan	Feb	Mar	Apr	May	Jun	Jul	Aug	Sep	Oct	Nov	Dec	Year
Mean daily maximum °C (°F)	30.5 (86.9)	31.1 (88.0)	29.9 (85.8)	28.4 (83.1)	25.8 (78.4)	25.2 (77.4)	25.0 (77.0)	26.1 (79.0)	26.9 (80.4)	28.1 (82.6)	28.4 (83.1)	29.9 (85.8)	27.9 (82.2)
Daily mean °C (°F)	23.9 (75.0)	23.9 (75.0)	23.1 (73.6)	21.4 (70.5)	18.5 (65.3)	17.0 (62.6)	16.6 (61.9)	17.5 (63.5)	19.5 (67.1)	21.3 (70.3)	22.2 (72.0)	23.5 (74.3)	20.7 (69.3)
Mean daily minimum °C (°F)	19.4 (66.9)	19.0 (66.2)	18.6 (65.5)	16.5 (61.7)	13.1 (55.6)	11.2 (52.2)	10.5 (50.9)	11.2 (52.2)	13.9 (57.0)	16.4 (61.5)	17.7 (63.9)	19.0 (66.2)	15.5 (59.9)
Average precipitation mm (inches)	213.5 (8.41)	135.1 (5.32)	133.2 (5.24)	56.1 (2.21)	40.6 (1.60)	21.3 (0.84)	14.1 (0.56)	16.2 (0.64)	53.2 (2.09)	86.5 (3.41)	173.4 (6.83)	215.3 (8.48)	1,158.5 (45.61)
Average precipitation days (≥ 1.0 mm)	14	10	10	6	4	2	2	3	5	7	11	13	87
Average relative humidity (%)	79.2	77.9	80.5	80.9	82.0	82.1	80.0	75.8	73.8	74.7	77.7	78.0	78.6
Mean monthly sunshine hours	191.7	197.9	195.8	198.3	189.6	198.5	197.0	208.8	155.3	167.0	169.7	181.1	2,250.7
Source: Instituto Nacional de Meteorologia (sun 1981–2010)
