= São Bernardo, Maranhão =

Coordinates: 3°21′39″S 42°25′04″W

- Municipality
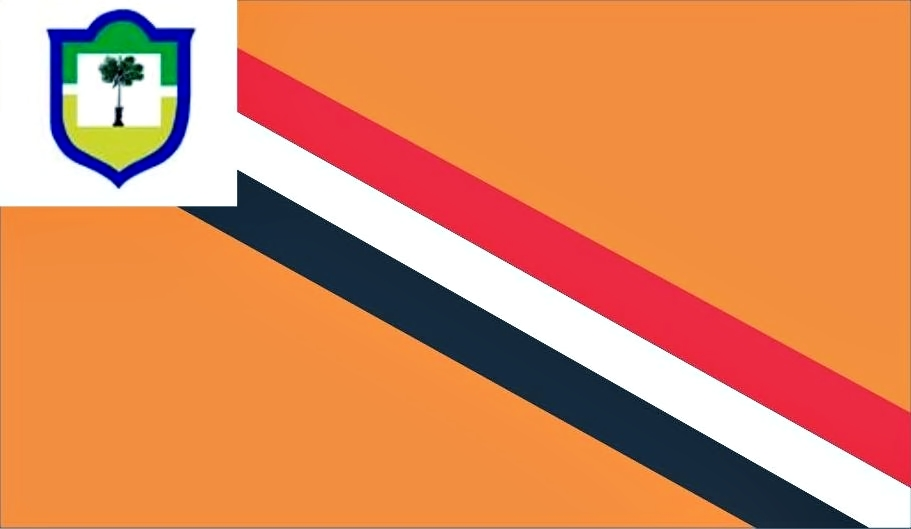
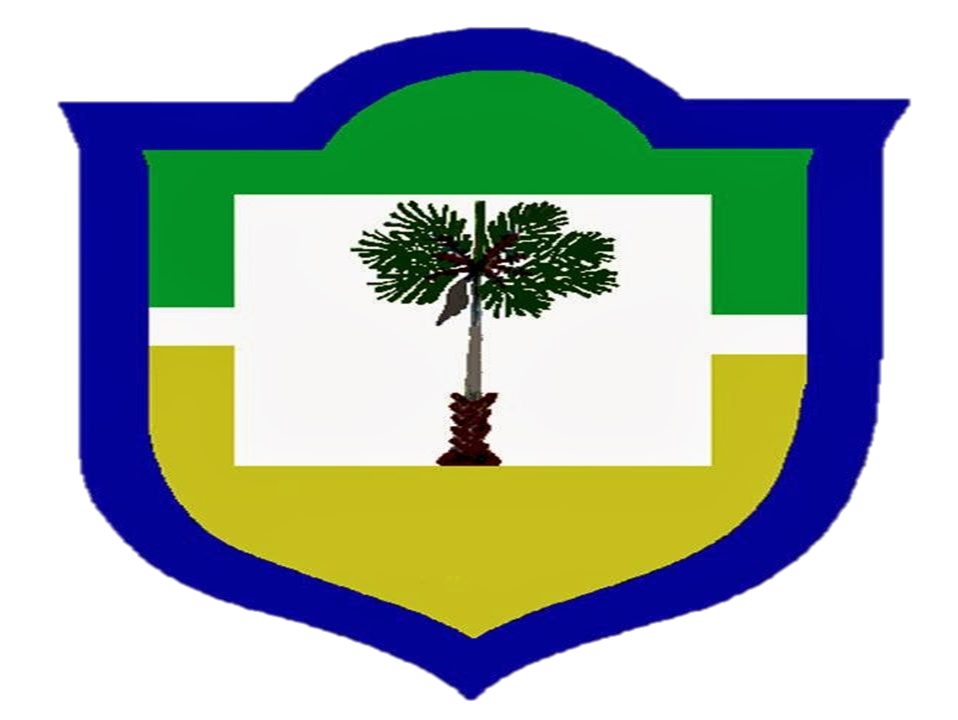
- Flag Coat of arms
- Interactive map of São Bernardo, Maranhão
- Country: Brazil
- Region: Nordeste
- State: Maranhão
- Mesoregion: Leste Maranhense

Population (2020)
  - Total: 28,667
- Time zone: UTC−3 (BRT)

São Bernardo, Maranhão is a municipality in the state of Maranhão in the Northeast region of Brazil. It is located at a latitude 03º21'41 "South and a longitude 42º25'04" West, being at an altitude of 43 meters. Its population is 28,667 inhabitants, according to estimate of the IBGE in 2020 and an extension territorial 1,006.920 km². Foundation Day is 29 March 1938.

The mayor is João Igor (2017 - 2020) of PMDB.

== History ==
Much has been speculated on the Marco initial of civilization in the territory in which today is installed the city of São Bernardo. However, nothing you can say categorically, in view of the absence of documentation. remains the tradition that the first invested in the territory municipal if processed through the priests Jesuits, in the eighteenth century. really, in the year 1700, driven by the sublime ideal released to the task of catechize Indians, for what had to embroiled by dense forests and inhospitable stops, coming to the location where is now the city of São Bernardo. the site that chose to starting point of their incursions by circunvizinhanças think to the margin of a small River at that gave the name of buriti. how to be natural, there planted the priests, as Marco assinalador of their Evangelistic purposes, a Church, built under the patronage and invocation of São Bernardo, which soon disappeared, emerging another in 1798, style simple, Colonial, and with a tower of relative height. today existing this Church that took the name of Matrix, because of that time, serve as a headquarters circumscription Jesuit, remains, in our days, as living certificate of action civilizing those priests. with the construction of the Church, released to the Jesuits, assisted by other elements, especially black captive, to the task of devassar the Earth discovery, whose domain extends to the riverbank parnaíba, in the mouth of the water cooler of São Peter, mouth of the igarapé San Jose, ponds bacuri and São Augustine, where, even today, can be found eloquent traces of action Church, as a great feitoria and farm creation of cattle, currently owned by the farmer dácio Almeida. so that the Jesuits be successful in colonization of new Earth, were also helped, greatly by indigenous, which is supposed to be the Indians troughs of the tribe tupinambas that as good fishermen, inhabited, preferably, the edges of the Rivers and Lakes. debauched the territory, gave it is home to the exploration of the land, too fertile, through the intensification of agriculture and livestock that even in the days present, continue to be in the main sources of wealth.

== Administration ==
The district was created under the name of Bernardo do Parnaíba, by provincial law n. 121, of 04-10-1841, subordinated to the municipality of Caxias.

Elevated to the category of village with the denomination of São Bernardo do Parnaíba, by the provincial law nº 550, of 07-30-1859, dismembered of Caxias. Headquarters in the current town of São Bernardo do Parnaíba. By the municipal law nº 30, of 09/26/1910, the districts of Melancias and Santa Quitéria were created and attached to the municipality of São Bernardo.

The administrative division since 1911 comprises three districts: São Bernardo do Parnaíba, Melancias and Santa Quitéria. By the state decree nº 75, of 04/22/1931, the municipality of São Bernardo do Parnaíba is extinguished, being its territory annexed to the new municipality of Santa Quitéria. Raised again the category of municipality by the state decree nº 235, of 07-01 -1932. Under the same decree extinguished the municipality of Santa Quitéria. By the state decree nº 539, of 16-12-1933, the municipalities of São Bernardo and Santa Quitéria are extinguished, being its territories annexed to the municipality of Brejo. In administrative division referring to the year of 1933, São Bernardo appears like district in the municipality of Brejo.Elevado again to the category of municipality with the denomination of Saint Bernard, by the state law nº 875, of 07-15-1935, dismembered of Brejo.Em division territorial waters dated 31-XII-1936 and 31-XII-1937, the municipality appears composed of 2 districts: São Bernardo and Magalhães de Almeida.

Thus remaining in territorial division dated from 1-VII-1950.

By the state law nº 771, of 01-09-1952, the district of Magalhães de Almeida dismembers of the municipality of São Bernardo. High to the category of municipality.

In territorial division dated I-VII-1960. the municipality is constituted of the district headquarters. So staying in territorial division dated 2005.

== See also ==
- List of municipalities in Maranhão
