= List of slave owners =

Each person listed here has both notability and a consensus of historical evidence of slave ownership. They are listed in alphabetical order by last name.

== A ==
- Adelicia Acklen (1817–1887), at one time the wealthiest woman in Tennessee, she inherited 750 enslaved people from her husband, Isaac Franklin.
- Green Adams (1812–1884), United States congressman, in a speech in the House of Representatives he described laboring alongside his own slaves while admitting that "much evil attends [the institutions of slavery]".
- Giovanni Pietro Francesco Agius de Soldanis (1712–1770), Maltese linguist, historian and cleric who owned at least one Muslim slave.
- Stair Agnew (1757–1821), land owner, judge and political figure in New Brunswick, he enslaved people and participated in court cases testing the legality of slavery in the colony.
- William Aiken (1779–1831), founder and president of the South Carolina Canal and Rail Road Company, enslaved hundreds on his rice plantation.
- William Aiken Jr. (1806–1887), 61st Governor of South Carolina, state legislator and member of the U.S. House of Representatives, recorded in the 1850 census as enslaving 878 people.
- Muhammad al-Badr (1926–1996), the last king of Yemen, had 13 slaves.
- Isaac Allen (1741–1806), New Brunswick judge, he dissented in an unsuccessful 1799 case challenging slavery (R v Jones), freeing his own slaves a short time later.
- Diego de Almagro (1475–1538), Spanish conquistador active in South America who owned Malgarida before freeing her.
- Joseph R. Anderson (1813–1892), civil engineer, he enslaved hundreds to operate his Tredegar Iron Works.
- John Armfield (1797–1871), Virginia co-founder of "the largest slave trading firm" in the United States, and a rapist.
- David Rice Atchison (1807–1883), U.S. Senator from Missouri, slave owner, prominent pro-slavery activist, and violent opponent of abolitionism.
- William Atherton (1742–1803), English owner of Jamaican sugar plantations.
- John James Audubon (1785–1851), American naturalist. He objected to Britain's abolition of slavery in the Caribbean and bought and sold enslaved people himself.
- Stephen F. Austin, American-born empresario and one of the founders of the Republic of Texas. He owned a few slaves and worked hard to protect and expand slavery in Texas.

== B ==
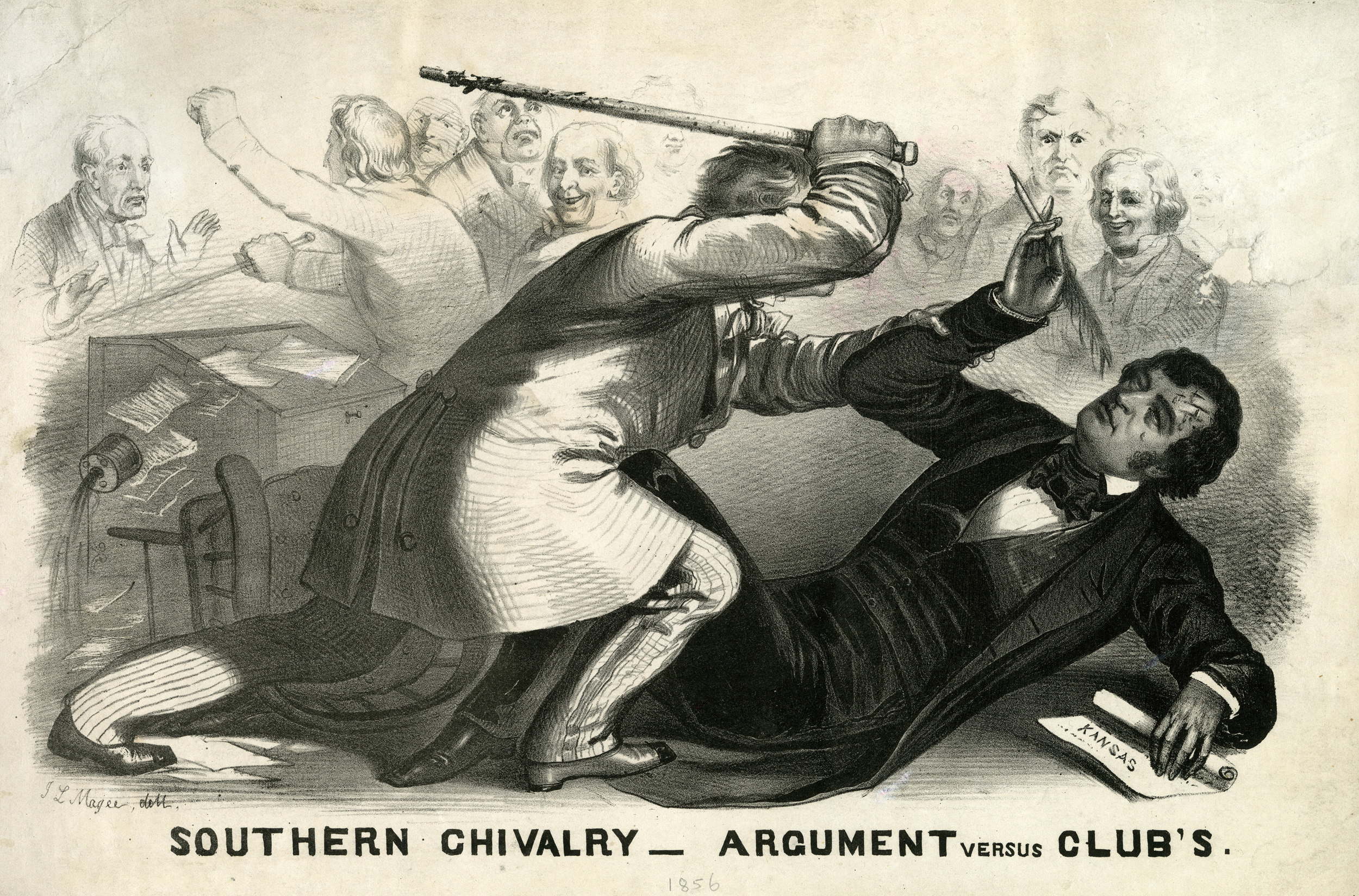
1856 lithograph of Preston Brooks attacking Charles Sumner, who had spoken against slavery two days earlier

- Jacques Baby (1731–1789), French Canadian fur trader, slaveholder, and father of James Baby.
- James Baby (1763–1833), prominent landowner, slaveholder, and official in Upper Canada.
- Abu Bakr al-Baghdadi (1971–2019), self-proclaimed Caliph of the Islamic State of Iraq and Syria (ISIS), he kept several sex slaves.
- Adriana Bake (1724–1787), wife of the Governor-General of the Dutch East Indies, her foster children freed her slaves after her death.
- Vasco Núñez de Balboa (1475–1519), Spanish explorer and conquistador, he enslaved the indigenous people he encountered in Central America.
- Emanoil Băleanu (c. 1793–1862), Wallachian politician, he enslaved Romani people on his estates. In 1856 he signed a letter protesting the abolition of slavery in Wallachia.
- Elizabeth Swain Bannister (c. 1785–1828), free woman of colour who owned 76 slaves in Berbice.
- Hayreddin Barbarossa (1478–1546), Ottoman corsair and admiral who enslaved the population of Corfu.
- William Barksdale (1821–1863), U.S. congressman and white supremacist, he enslaved 36 people by 1860 and vigorously defended the institution of slavery.
- Alexander Barrow (1801–1846), U.S. senator and Louisiana planter.
- George Washington Barrow (1807–1866), Congressman and U.S. minister to Portugal, who purchased 112 enslaved people in Louisiana.
- Robert Ruffin Barrow (1798–1875), American plantation owner who owned more than 450 slaves and a dozen plantations.
- William Beckford (1709–1770), politician and twice Lord Mayor of London. He inherited about 3,000 enslaved people from his brother Peter.
- William Thomas Beckford (1760–1844), writer and collector. He inherited about 3,000 enslaved people from his father.
- Benjamin Belcher (1743–1802), Nova Scotia politician and militia leader, he enslaved at least 7 people.
- Zabeau Bellanton (fl. 1782), free woman of color and slave trader in Saint Domingue.
- Judah P. Benjamin (1811–1884), Secretary of State for the Confederate States of America, a U.S. Senator from Louisiana, and a vocal supporter of slavery.
- Charles Bent (1799–1847), American trader and first Territorial Governor of New Mexico during the United States occupation of New Mexico during the Mexican-American War. Bent owned Charlotte and Dick Green. Charles's brother William freed the Greens after Dick fought with the posse that avenged Charles's assassination during the Taos Revolt.
- Thomas H. Benton (1782–1858), American senator from Missouri.
- George Berkeley (1685–1753), Anglo-Irish philosopher who purchased several enslaved Africans to work on his plantation in Rhode Island.
- John M. Berrien (1781–1856), U.S. Senator from Georgia who argued that slavery "lay at the foundation of the Constitution" and that slaves "constitute the very foundation of your union".
- Antoine Bestel (1766–1852), lawyer from France who migrated to Mauritius where he owned at least 122 slaves.
- James G. Birney (1792–1857), an attorney and planter who freed his slaves and became an abolitionist.
- James Blair (c. 1788–1841), British MP who owned sugar plantations in Demerara.
- Simón Bolívar (1783–1830), wealthy slave owner who became a Latin American independence leader and eventually an abolitionist.
- Shadrach Bond (1773–1832), 1st governor of Illinois, he enslaved people on his farm in Monroe County.
- Joseph Boucher de Niverville (1715–1804), military officer in New France, he enslaved a Cree woman named Marie.
- James Bowie (c. 1796–1836), namesake of the Bowie knife, soldier at the Alamo, and slave trader.
- Benjamin Boyd (1801–1851), Scottish entrepreneur and slave trader thought to be Australia's first "blackbirder".
- Joseph Brant (1747–1803), Mohawk military and political leader.
- William Brattle (1706–1776), American politician and military officer, he was identified as a slave owner in a 2022 Harvard investigation into that university's legacy of slavery.
- John C. Breckinridge (1821–1875), 14th Vice President of the United States and Confederate Secretary of War. He enslaved people until at least 1857.
- Simone Brocard (fl. 1784), a "free colored" woman of Saint-Domingue, a slave trader, and one of the wealthiest women of that French colony.
- Preston Brooks (1819–1857), veteran of the Mexican–American War and U.S. Congressman from South Carolina. A slaveholder, he beat abolitionist senator Charles Sumner nearly to death after the latter spoke against slavery in the Senate.
- James Brown (1766–1835), U.S. Minister to France, U.S. Senator, and sugarcane planter, some of whose slaves were involved in the 1811 German Coast uprising in what is now Louisiana.
- Chang and Eng Bunker (1811–1874), Siamese twins who became successful entertainers in the United States.
- John Burbidge (c. 1718–1812), Nova Scotia soldier, land owner, judge, and politician, he freed his slaves in 1790.
- Pierce Butler (1744–1822), U.S. Founding Father and plantation owner.
- William Orlando Butler (1791–1880), American general and politician, he advocated for gradual emancipation and enslaved people himself.

== C ==
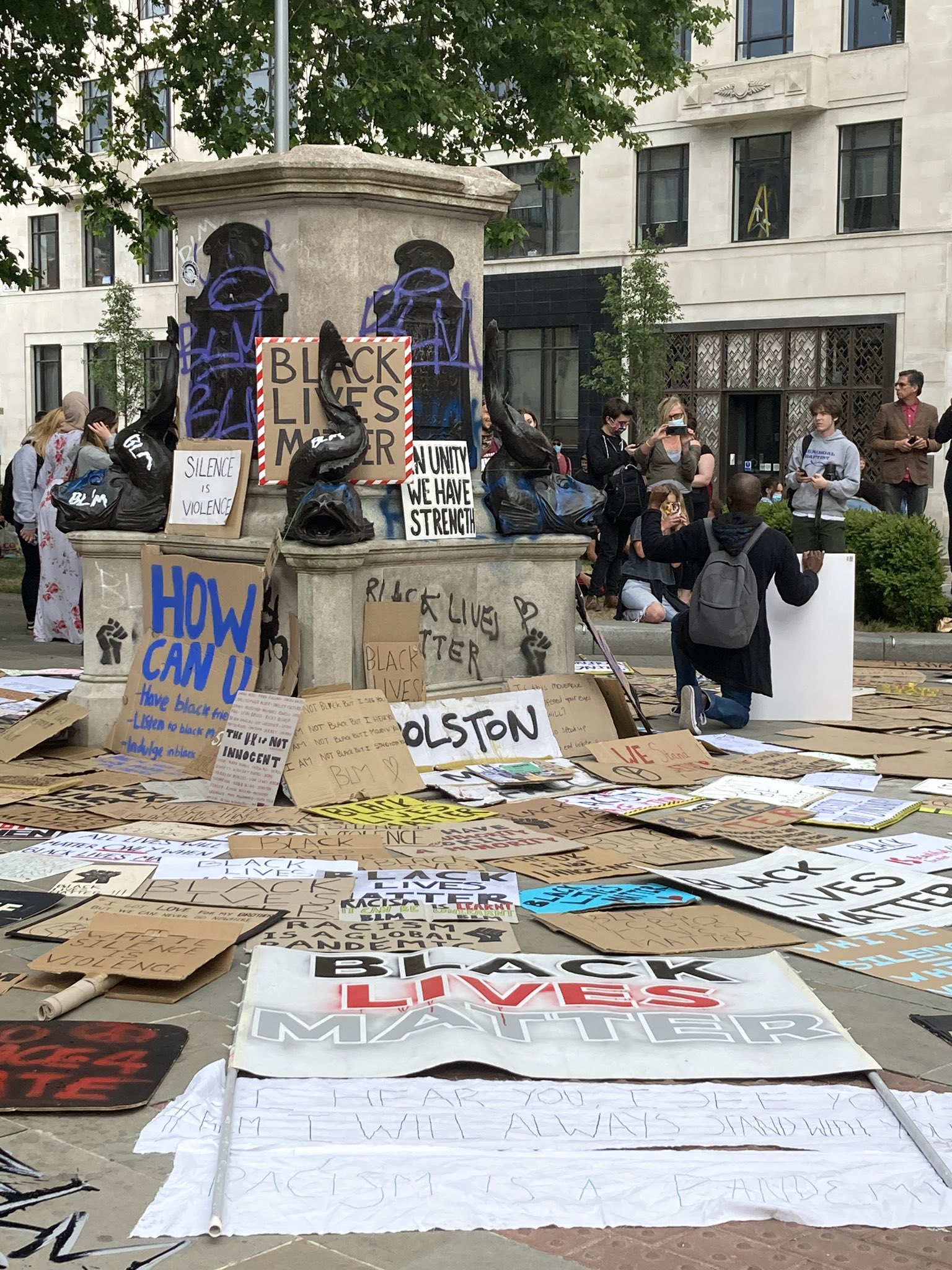
The reputation of Edward Colston, long praised for philanthropy, has been reassessed as his connections to slave-trading were uncovered. Protestors toppled his statue in Bristol in 2020.

- Daniel Cady (1773–1859), US Representative, judge, and father of Elizabeth Cady Stanton enslaved his servant Peter Teabout until emancipation came to New York state in 1827.
- Julius Caesar (100–44 BCE), Roman dictator, he once sold the entire population of Atuatuci into slavery. He personally owned slaves, some of whom he freed, such as Julius Zoilos.
- Charles Caldwell (1772–1853), American physician who started what is now the University of Louisville School of Medicine. He defended slavery and even owned house slaves himself.
- John C. Calhoun (1782–1850), 7th Vice President of the United States, owned slaves and asserted that slavery was a "positive good" rather than a "necessary evil".
- Meredith Calhoun (1805–1869), Louisiana planter, merchant, slavetrader, and journalist. There have been reports dating to the 19th century that author Harriet Beecher Stowe based the character of Simon Legree in her novel Uncle Tom's Cabin (1852) on Calhoun.
- Paul C. Cameron (1808–1891), North Carolina slaveholder and North Carolina Supreme Court justice. By about 1860, he owned 30,000 acres of land and 1,900 slaves.
- William Capell, 4th Earl of Essex (1732–1799), he enslaved George Edward Doney as a servant.
- Caravaggio (1571–1610), Italian artist and Hospitaller knight, who while in Malta was gifted slaves by Grand Master Alof de Wignacourt in recognition for his work as a painter.
- Charles Carroll (1737–1832), signer of Declaration of Independence, enslaved approximately 300 people on his estate in Maryland.
- Landon Carter (1710–1778), Virginia planter who enslaved as many as 500 people by the end of his life.
- Robert "King" Carter (1663–1732), Virginia landowner and acting governor of Virginia. He left 3000 enslaved people to his heirs.
- Samuel A. Cartwright (1793–1863), American physician who invented the pseudoscientific diagnosis of drapetomania to explain the desire for freedom among enslaved Africans.
- Lewis Cass (1782–1866), American politician prominent in Michigan, was known to have owned at least one slave.
- Girolamo Cassar (c. 1520 – c. 1592), Maltese architect who owned at least two slaves.
- Cato the Elder (234–149 BCE), Roman statesman. Plutarch reported that he owned many slaves, purchasing the youngest captives of war.
- Pietru Caxaro (died 1485), Maltese notary, orator, politician, philosopher, and poet, who had at least six slaves in his service.
- Carlos Manuel de Céspedes (1819–1874), a Cuban revolutionary, he emancipated his own slaves at the beginning of the Ten Years' War, but only advocated for gradual abolition throughout Cuba.
- Auguste Chouteau (c. 1750–1829), co-founder of the city of St. Louis, at the time of his death he owned 36 enslaved people.
- Pierre Chouteau (1758–1849), half-brother of Auguste Chouteau and defendant in a freedom suit by Marguerite Scypion.
- Cicero (106–43 BCE), Roman statesman and philosopher. He enslaved at least four people, but the true number is likely higher.
- William Clark (1770–1838), American explorer and territorial governor, he brought one of his African-American slaves with him on the Lewis and Clark Expedition.
- Nancy Clarke a Barbadian hotelier and free woman of colour.
- Henry Clay (1777–1852), United States Secretary of State and Speaker of the House, he advocated for gradual emancipation but owned slaves until his death.
- Howell Cobb (1815–1868), U.S. Congressman, Secretary of the Treasury, 19th Speaker of the House, and 40th Governor of Georgia. One hundred people were enslaved on his plantation until they were liberated by William T. Sherman and his army.
- Edward Coles (1786–1868), 2nd governor of Illinois; an abolitionist, he inherited slaves from his father and freed them.
- Amaryllis Collymore (1745–1828), Barbadian slave and later slave owner and planter.
- Alfred H. Colquitt (1824–1894), U.S. Congressman, 49th Governor of Georgia, and Confederate Army Major General, he wanted to lift restrictions on slavery in the western territory and was himself a slave owner.
- Edward Colston (1636–1711), English merchant, philanthropist and slave trader.
- Christopher Columbus (1451–1506), enslaved the Taíno and Arawak people and "sent the first slaves across the Atlantic."
- Confucius, in book 10 of the Analects Confucius is praised for enquiring about his slaves before his horses when his stables burned down.
- Hernán Cortés (1485–1547), Spanish conquistador who invaded Mexico.
- Thérèse de Couagne (1697–1764), Montreal businesswoman, she enslaved Marie-Joseph Angélique who attempted to escape repeatedly.

== D ==
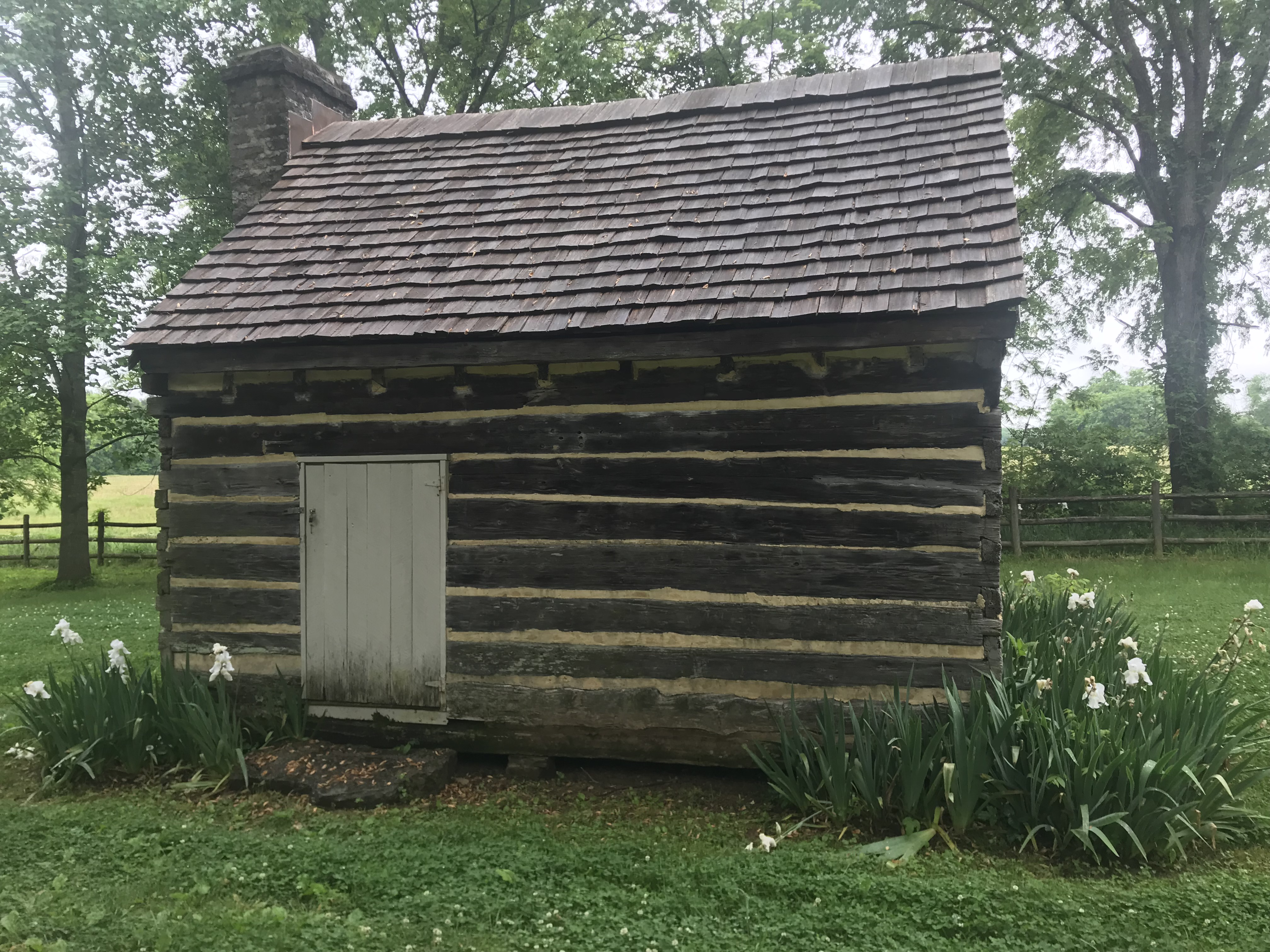
A slave cabin on the grounds of the home of Sam Davis in Smyrna, Tennessee

- Sir Robert Davers, 1st Baronet (c. 1620–1684), English plantation and slave owner in Barbados.
- Sir Robert Davers, 2nd Baronet (c. 1653–1722), English politician and landowner, he enslaved some 200 people on his plantation in Barbados.
- Jefferson Davis (1807–1889), President of the Confederate States of America during the American Civil War. He enslaved as many as 113 people on his Mississippi plantation.
- Joseph Davis (1784–1870), eldest brother of Jefferson Davis and one of the wealthiest antebellum planters in Mississippi, he enslaved at least 345 people on his Hurricane Plantation.
- Sam Davis (1842–1863), Confederate soldier executed by Union forces. He came from a family of slave owners and, as a child, was given an enslaved person.
- Francisco Paulo de Almeida, Baron of Guaraciaba (1826–1901), Afro-Brazilian landowner, businessman, and nobleman. He owned several coffee plantations as well as around a thousand slaves.
- James De Lancey (1703–1760), judge and politician in colonial New York. His own slave, Othello, was accused of attending a meeting related to the Conspiracy of 1741 and De Lancey sentenced him and other suspected enslaved conspirators to death.
- James De Lancey (1746–1804), colonial American and leader of a loyalist brigade. When he fled to Nova Scotia after the War of Independence, he took six enslaved people with him.
- Abraham de Peyster (1657–1728), 20th mayor of New York City, he purchased two enslaved people in 1797.
- Demosthenes (384–322 BCE), Athenian statesman and orator who inherited at least 14 slaves from his father.
- Henry Denny Denson (c. 1715–1780), Irish-born soldier and politician in Nova Scotia, he enslaved at least five people.
- Jean Noël Destréhan (1754–1823), Louisiana plantation owner whose slaves rebelled during the 1811 German Coast Uprising.
- Thomas Roderick Dew (1802–1846), president of the College of William & Mary; he was an influential pro-slavery advocate, owning one enslaved person himself.
- John Dickinson (1732–1808), a Founding Father of the United States. Largest slaveholder in Philadelphia in 1766, he freed them in 1777.
- Albert Baldwin Dod (1805–1845), mathematician, theologian, and Princeton University professor. The 1840 US Census records Dod owning one enslaved female aged ten to twenty-four, making him one of the latest slaveholders in both Princeton and the entire state of New Jersey, which had adopted a system of gradual emancipation in 1804.
- Henry Dodge (1782–1867), 1st and 4th governor of the Wisconsin Territory. In 1827, defying the Northwest Ordinance's prohibition of slavery in the territory, Dodge brought five Black slaves from Missouri to work his lead mines.
- Domingos Malaquias de Aguiar Pires Ferreira, 1st Baron of Cimbres (1788–1859), congressman for the Constituent Cortes of 1820 and congressman and vice-president of the Province of Pernambuco. He had investments on engenhos and left slaves as inheritance for his children.
- Thomas Dorland (1759–1832), Quaker, farmer and politician in Upper Canada, he enslaved as many as 20 people.
- Stephen A. Douglas (1813–1861), U.S. Senator from Illinois and 1860 U.S. Democratic presidential candidate. He inherited a Mississippi plantation and 100 slaves from his father-in-law. Historians continue to debate whether he opposed slavery.
- Richard Duncan (died 1819), politician in Upper Canada and slave owner.
- Stephen Duncan (1787–1867), originally from Pennsylvania, he became the wealthiest Southern cotton planter before the American Civil War with 14 plantations where he enslaved 2200 people.
- Robley Dunglison (1798–1869), English-American physician, medical educator and author—purchased slaves from Thomas Jefferson while teaching at University of Virginia.

== E ==
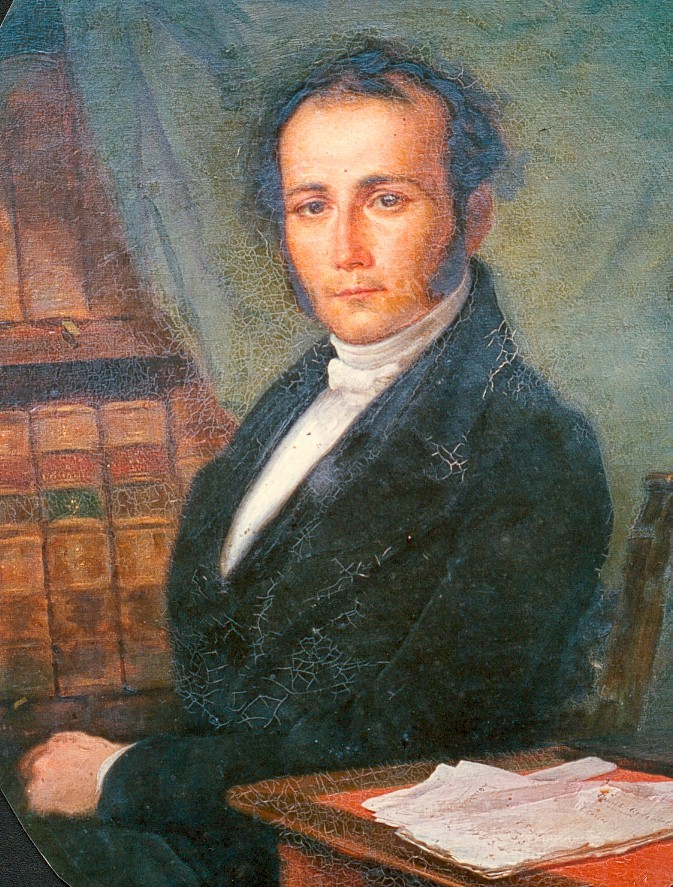
Adrien d'Epinay opposed efforts to ameliorate or end slavery on Mauritius

- John Early (1786–1873), Methodist Episcopal bishop from Virginia. A slave owner, he used his role in the church to advocate in favor of slavery.
- Jonathan Edwards (1703–1758), American Congregationalist theologian who played a critical role in shaping the First Great Awakening. He owned several slaves during his lifetime.
- Ninian Edwards (1775–1833), Governor of Illinois Territory and 3rd governor of Illinois. He was a slave owner and evaded the Northwest Ordinance, which outlawed slavery in the territory.
- Matthew Elliott (c. 1739–1814), a Loyalist, he captured slaves during the American Revolution and kept them on his farm in Upper Canada in defiance of government pressure.
- George Ellis (1753–1815), English antiquary, poet and Member of Parliament, he enslaved people on his sugar plantations in Jamaica.
- William Ellison (1790–1861), an African-American slave and later a slave owner.
- Adrien d'Épinay (1794–1839), lawyer and politician of Mauritius.
- Edwin Epps (born c. 1808), former overseer turned planter and, for 10 years, owner of Solomon Northup, who authored Twelve Years a Slave.
- Erchinoald (died 658), mayor of the palace of Neustria (in present-day France). He introduced his slave, Balthild, to Clovis II who made her his wife and queen consort.

== F ==
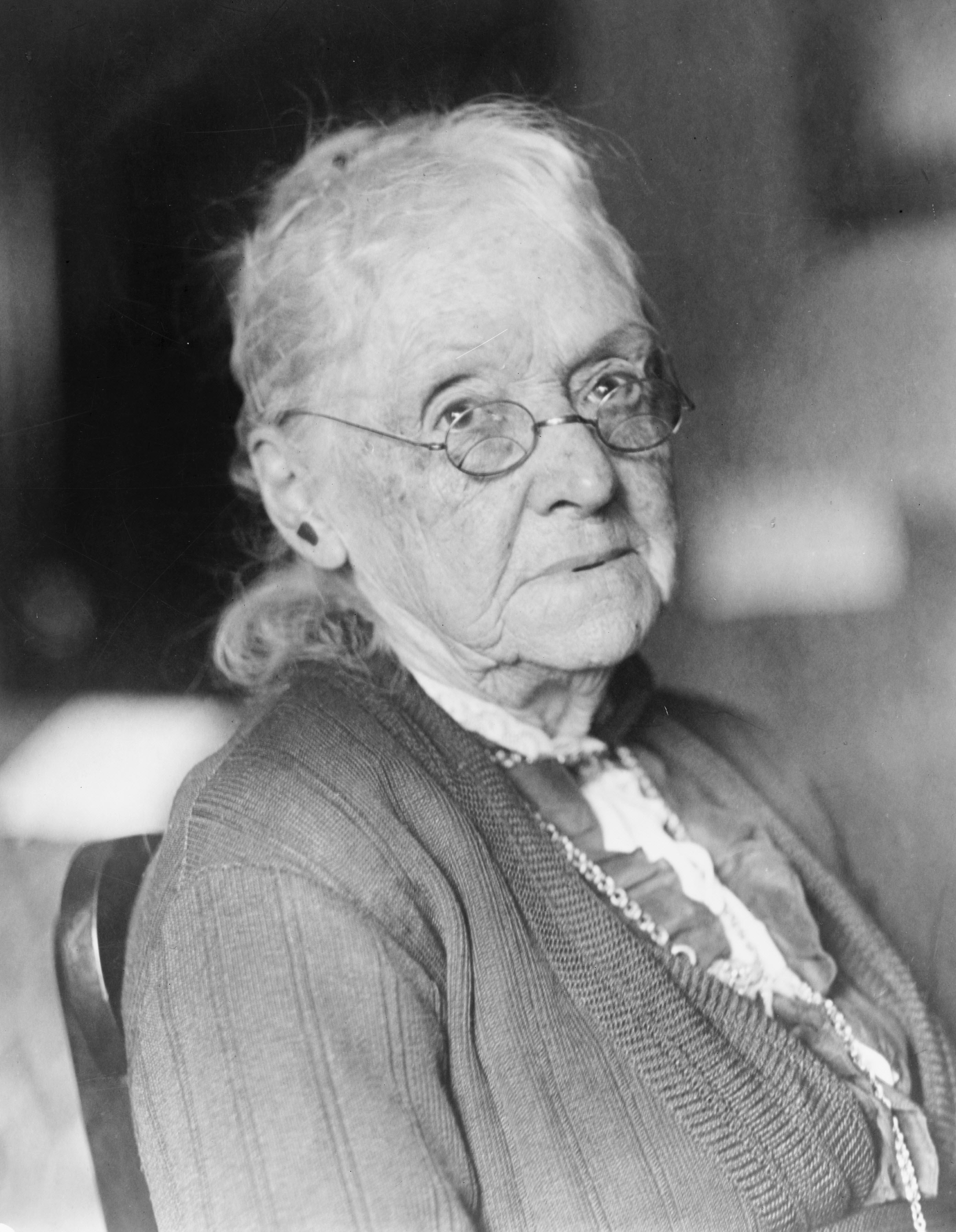
Senator Rebecca Latimer Felton, the last member of the U.S. Congress to have enslaved people

- Mary Faber (1798–fl. 1857), Guinean slave trader known for her conflict with the West Africa Squadron.
- Peter Faneuil (1700–1743), Colonial American slave trader and owner, and namesake of Boston's Faneuil Hall.
- Benjamin Farar Sr. (d. 1790), American plantation owner and public official.
- Rebecca Latimer Felton (1835–1930), suffragist, white supremacist, and senator for Georgia, she was the last member of the U.S. Congress to have been a slave owner.
- Antônio Pires Ferreira (1799–1877), a powerful farmer responsible for building Engenho Paraíso, the most important engenho from Maranhão.
- Eliza Fenwick (1767–1840), British author, she used slave labor in her Barbados schoolhouse.
- Fernando Pires Ferreira (1842–1907), the father of ophthalmology in Brazil. After his father died in 1877, he inherited part of property, including the slaves. He wasn't interested in farming, and his property was passed to his relatives that lived in Piauí and Maranhão, instead of his children.
- Firmino Pires Ferreira (1848–1930), important Brazilian military and politician during the Old Republic. When he got married in 1875, "the party lasted two whole days, with the guests and slaves dancing, singing, drinking and eating".
- Joaquim Pires Ferreira (born 1761), a merchant and a collaborator of the Pernambucan revolt. He had slaves.
- José Pires Ferreira (born 1757), a merchant, he eventually inherited lands from his father and the parents of his wife and became a slave owner.
- Nathan Bedford Forrest (1821–1877), Confederate general, slave trader, and Ku Klux Klan leader.
- John Forsyth (1780–1841), congressman, senator, Secretary of State, and 33rd Governor of Georgia. He supported slavery and was a slaveholder.
- Benjamin Franklin (1706–1790), American statesman and philosopher, who owned as many as seven slaves before becoming a "cautious abolitionist".
- Isaac Franklin (1789–1846), owner of more than 600 slaves, partner in the largest U.S. slave trading firm Franklin and Armfield, and rapist.

== G ==
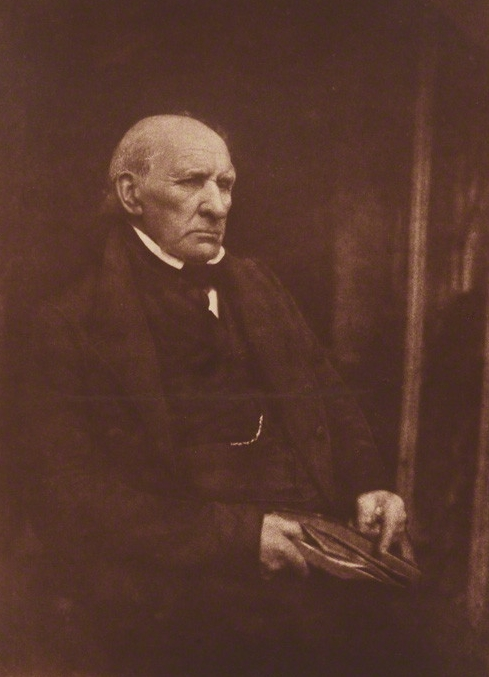
Sir John Gladstone replaced his plantation slaves with indentured servants who were treated much the same.

- Tacitus Gaillard (1718–1786), plantation owner and public official in British colonial South Carolina.
- Ana Gallum (or Nansi Wiggins; fl. 1811), was an African Senegalese slave who was freed and married the white Florida planter Don Joseph "Job" Wiggins, in 1801 succeeding in having his will, leaving her his plantation and slaves, recognized as legal.
- James Garland (1791–1885), Virginian politician, planter, lawyer, and judge. By 1820, the Garland household included five free people and nine slaves.
- Horatio Gates (1727–1806), American general during the American Revolutionary War. Seven years later, he sold his plantation, freed his slaves, and moved north to New York.
- Sir John Gladstone (1764–1851), British politician, owner of plantations in Jamaica and Guyana, and recipient of the single largest payment from the Slave Compensation Commission.
- Estêvão Gomes (c. 1483–1538), Portuguese explorer, in 1525 he kidnapped at least 58 indigenous people from what is now Maine or Nova Scotia, taking them to Spain where he attempted to sell them as slaves.
- Antão Gonçalves (15th-century), Portuguese explorer and, in 1441, the first to enslave captive Africans and bring them to Portugal for sale.
- Ulysses S. Grant (1822–1885), Union general and 18th President of the United States, who acquired slaves through his wife and father-in-law. On March 29, 1859, Grant freed his slave William Jones, making Jones the last person to have been enslaved by a person who later served as U.S. president.
- Robert Isaac Dey Gray (c. 1772–1804), Canadian politician and slave owner. In 1798 he voted against a proposal to expand slavery in Upper Canada.
- Curtis Grubb (c. 1730–1789), Pennsylvania iron master and one of the state's largest enslavers at the time of U.S. independence.

== H ==
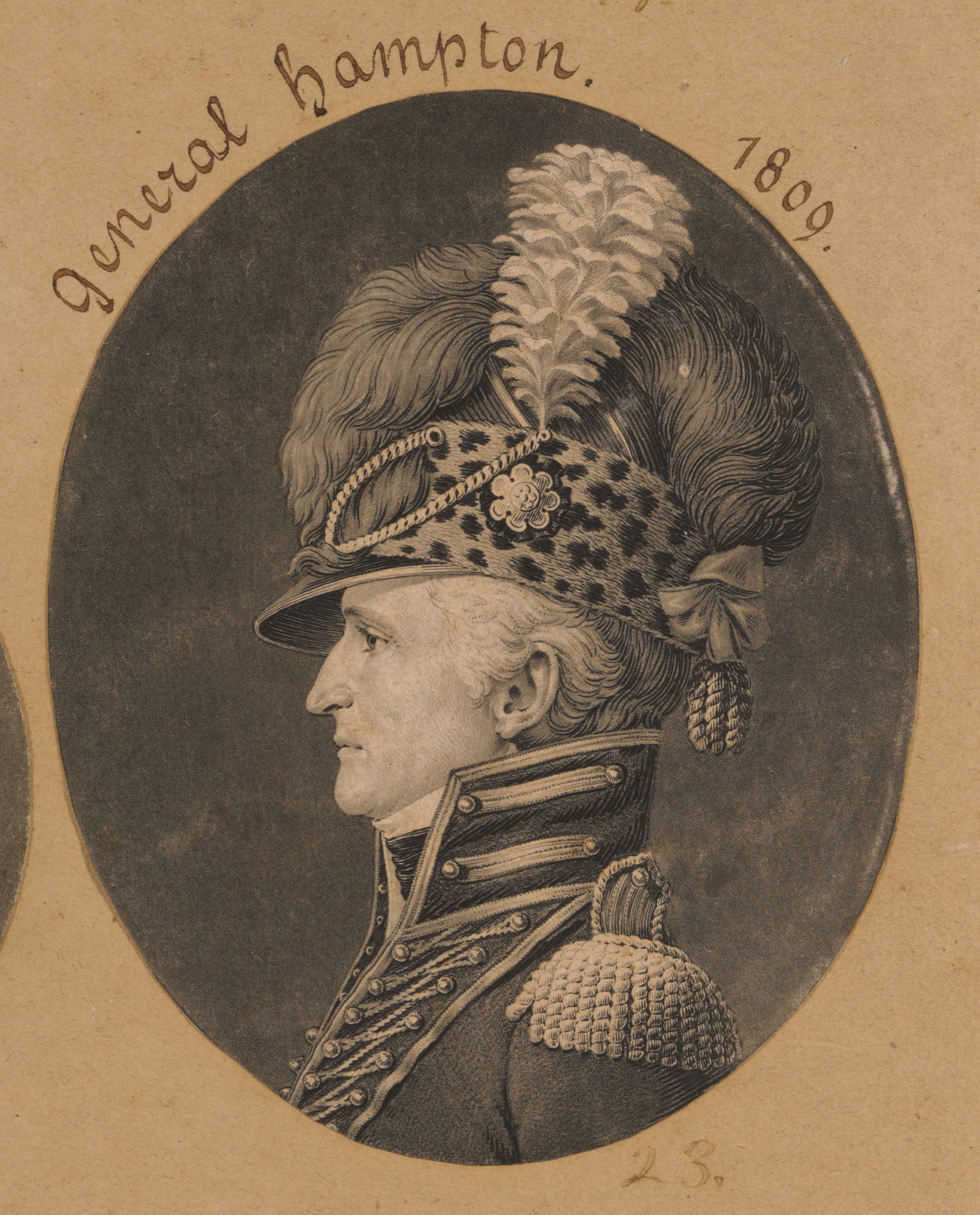
Major General Wade Hampton helped suppress an 1811 slave uprising in Louisiana.

- James Henry Hammond (1807–1864), U.S. senator and South Carolina governor, defender of slavery, and owner of more than 300 slaves.
- Wade Hampton I (c. 1752 – 1835), American general, congressman, and planter. One of the largest slave-holders in the country, he was alleged to have conducted experiments on the people he enslaved.
- Wade Hampton II (1791–1858), American soldier and planter with land holdings in three states. He held a total of 335 slaves in Mississippi by 1860.
- Wade Hampton III (1818–1902), U.S. senator, governor of South Carolina, Confederate lieutenant general, planter, slave owner, white supremacist, and proponent of the Lost Cause.
- John Hancock (1737–1793), American statesman. He inherited several household slaves who were eventually freed through the terms of his uncle's will; there is no evidence that he ever bought or sold slaves himself.
- Benjamin Harrison IV (1693–1745), American planter and politician. Upon his death each of his ten surviving children inherited slaves from his estate.
- Benjamin Harrison V (1726–1791), American politician, United States Declaration of Independence signatory, he inherited a plantation and the people enslaved upon it from his father.
- Benjamin Hawkins (1754–1816), Continental Congress delegate, senator for North Carolina, and appointed by George Washington as Indian agent of the United States. He built a large complex using slave labour and transformed Creek Agency and Fort Hawkins into holding stations for fugitive slaves.
- William Henry Harrison (1773–1841), 9th president of the United States, he owned eleven slaves.
- Patrick Henry (1736–1799), American statesman and orator. He wrote in 1773, "I am the master of slaves of my own purchase. I am drawn along by the general inconvenience of living here without them. I will not, I cannot justify it."
- Thomas Heyward Jr. (1746–1809), South Carolina judge, planter, and signer of the U.S. Declaration of Independence. He impregnated at least one of the women he enslaved, making him the grandfather of Thomas E. Miller, one of only five African Americans elected to Congress from the South in the 1890s.
- George Hibbert (1757–1837), English merchant, politician, and shipowner. A leading member of the pro-slavery lobby, he was awarded £16,000 in compensation after Britain abolished slavery.
- Thomas Hibbert (1710–1780), English merchant, he became rich from slave labor on his Jamaican plantations.
- Eufrosina Hinard (born 1777), a free black woman in New Orleans, she owned slaves and leased them to others.
- Thomas C. Hindman (1828–1868), American politician and Confederate general. During the Civil War he rented two enslaved families to the medical director of the Army of Tennessee.
- Hipponicus III (c. 485 BC – 422/1 BC), wealthy Athenian general; according to Xenophon he leased six hundred slaves to the state to work in the silver Mines of Laurion.
- Arthur William Hodge (1763–1811), British Virgin Islands planter, the first, and likely only, British subject executed for the murder of his own slave.
- Jean-François Hodoul (1765–1835), captain, corsair, merchant and plantation owner who moved from France and settled in Mauritius and Seychelles.
- Johns Hopkins (1795–1873), philanthropist who donated seed money for the creation of Johns Hopkins University.
- Sam Houston (1793–1863), U.S. senator, president of the Republic of Texas, 6th governor of Tennessee, and 7th governor of Texas; he enslaved twelve people.
- Hjörleifr Hróðmarsson (9th century), early settler of Iceland whose thralls (slaves) rebelled and killed him.
- Abijah Hunt (1762–1811), planter and merchant in the Natchez District in Mississippi. In 1808, he sold one of his plantations, complete with 60 or 61 slaves.
- David Hunt (1779–1861), wealthy planter in the Natchez District of Mississippi and the largest benefactor of Oakland College, he and his married children enslaved nearly 1,700 people.
- Margaret Hutton (1727–1797), largest enslaver in Pennsylvania at the time of the first federal census.

== I ==
- Ibn Battuta (1304 – c. 1368), Muslim Berber Moroccan scholar and explorer. He enslaved girls and women in his harem.
- Emina Ilhamy (1858–1931), Egyptian princess, she gifted enslaved concubines to her son and owned slaves until the First World War.

== J ==
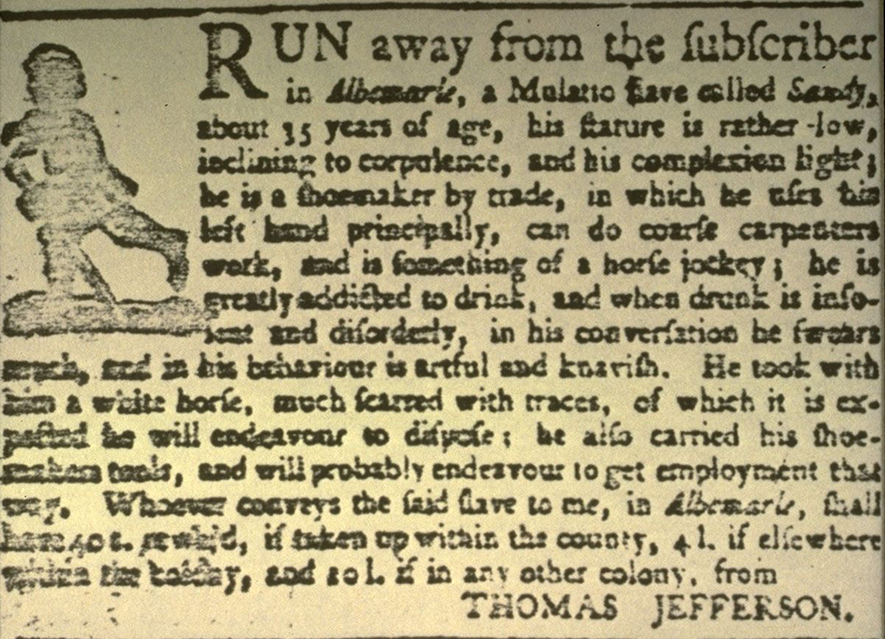
In 1769 Thomas Jefferson placed an advertisement in the Virginia Gazette offering a reward for an escaped slave named Sandy.

- Andrew Jackson (1767–1845), 7th President of the United States, he enslaved as many as 300 people.
- William James (1791–1861), English Radical politician and owner of a West Indies plantation.
- William Jarvis (1756–1817), prominent landowner and government official in York, Upper Canada.
- Peter Jefferson (1708–1757), father of U.S. President Thomas Jefferson. In his last will and testament he set free the slaves who remained his after paying Monticello's debts.
- Thomas Jefferson (1743–1826), 3rd President of the United States. He had a long-term sexual relationship with enslaved Sally Hemings.
- Thomas Jeremiah (died 1775), a free Negro executed in the Province of South Carolina for attempting to foment a slave insurrection.
- Andrew Johnson (1808–1875), 17th President of the United States, he opposed the 14th Amendment (which granted citizenship to former slaves) and owned at least ten slaves before the Civil War.
- Anthony Johnson (1600–1670), brought to Virginia in 1621 as an indentured servant, he gained his freedom, and became a successful tobacco planter and landowner on Virginia's Eastern Shore, one of the earliest free Black property owners in the colonies. He is known for the 1655 court case in which he won the right to hold John Casor as a servant for life, one of the first instances of lifelong slavery being established through a civil (rather than criminal) court ruling in the American colonies.

== K ==
- William King (1812–1895), he enslaved as many as 15 people before becoming an abolitionist and establishing the Elgin settlement, a community of former slaves in southwestern Ontario.
- Anna Kingsley (1793–1870), African-born, when she was thirteen Zephaniah Kingsley bought her to be his wife; she later owned slaves in her own right.
- Zephaniah Kingsley (1765–1843), planter and slave trader, defender of slavery and of what then was called "amalgamation", interracial marriage.
- James Knight (c. 1640–c. 1721), English explorer and Hudson's Bay Company director, he enslaved indigenous women, including Thanadelthur.

== L ==
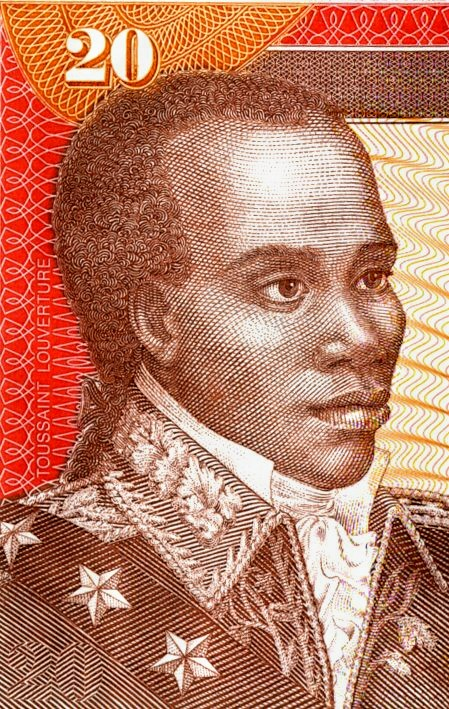
Toussaint Louverture was born into slavery, then owned slaves, and eventually liberated Haiti's slaves.

- Cristóvão Lins (1529–?), German settler in Colonial Brazil, he enslaved Potiguaras and Caetés during the Potiguara War and used African slaves in his engenhos.
- James Ladson (1753–1812), lieutenant governor of South Carolina, he enslaved over 100 people in that state.
- James H. Ladson (1795–1868), businessman and South Carolina planter.
- Henry Laurens (1724–1792), 5th President of the Continental Congress, his company, Austin and Laurens, was the largest slave-trader in North America.
- Delphine LaLaurie (1787–1849), New Orleans socialite and serial killer, infamous for torturing and murdering slaves in her household.
- John Lamont (1782–1850), Scottish emigrant who enslaved people on his Trinidad sugar plantations.
- Marie Laveau (1801–1881), Louisiana Voodoo practitioner, she enslaved at least seven people.
- Fenda Lawrence (born 1742), slave trader based in Saloum. She visited the Thirteen Colonies as a free black woman.
- Richard Bland Lee (1761–1827), American politician, he inherited a Virginia plantation and 29 slaves in 1787.
- Robert E. Lee (1807–1870), commander of the Confederate States Army during the American Civil War, inherited 10 enslaved people from his mother and oversaw nearly 200 slaves on the Arlington Plantation his wife inherited from her father George Washington Parke Custis.
- William Lenoir (1751–1839), American Revolutionary War officer and prominent statesman, he was the largest slave-holder in the history of Wilkes County, North Carolina.
- William Ballard Lenoir (1775–1852), mill-owner and Tennessee politician, he used both paid and forced labor in his mills.
- Uriah P. Levy (1792–1862), Jewish American naval officer, real estate investor, and philanthropist. He purchased Monticello in the 1830s and purchased at least a dozen slaves to restore and operate the property.
- Francis Lieber (1800–1872), German-American jurist and political philosopher who authored the Lieber Code during the American Civil War. He enslaved people in South Carolina before he moved north to New York.
- Edward Lloyd (1779–1834), American politician from Maryland, in 1832 owned 468 people, including abolitionist Frederick Douglass (then known as Frederick Bailey).
- Edward Long (1734–1813), English colonial administrator and planter in Jamaica. He was a slave-owner and polemic defender of slavery.
- George Long (1800–1879), English classical scholar. Long acquired a slave named Jacob while teaching at the University of Virginia and brought him back to England, where he was listed in the census as a manservant.
- Toussaint Louverture (1743–1803), a former slave, he enslaved a dozen people himself before becoming a general and a leader of the Haitian Revolution.
- George Duncan Ludlow (1734–1808), colonial lawyer. He was a slave owner and, in 1800 as Chief Justice of New Brunswick, he supported slavery in defiance of British practice at the time.
- David Lynd (c. 1745–1802), seigneur and politician in Lower Canada. He enslaved at least two people and voted against abolition in 1793.

== M ==
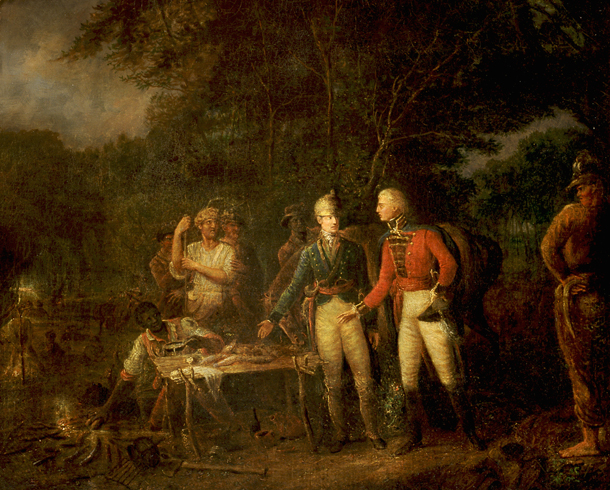
General Marion Inviting a British Officer to Share His Meal (c. 1835); his slave Oscar Marion kneels at the left of the group.

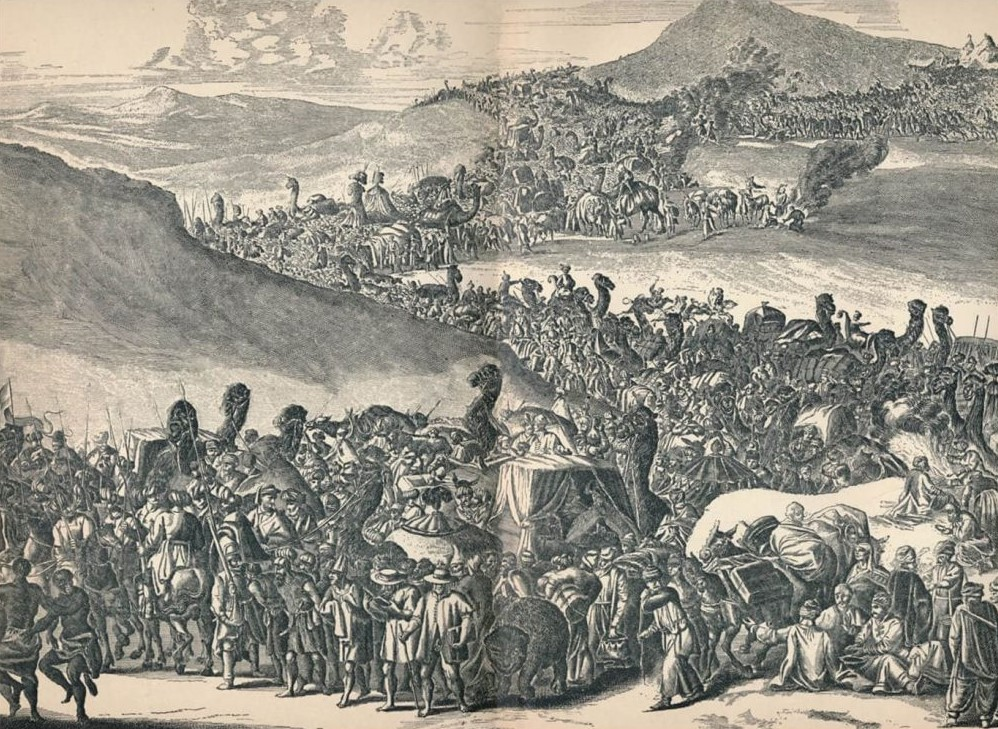
Mansa Musa, accompanied by thousands of slaves, traveling to Mecca

- Macuncuzade Mustafa Efendi (born c. 1550s), Ottoman qadi and poet who owned at least one slave. He and his slave were on board a ship which was captured by the Knights Hospitaller in 1597, and they were both enslaved in Malta until 1600.
- James Madison (1751–1836), 4th President of the United States, by 1801 he enslaved more than 100 people on his Montpelier plantation.
- James Madison Sr. (1723–1801), father of President James Madison, by the time of his death, he owned 108 slaves.
- Ferdinand Magellan (c. 1480–1521), Portuguese navigator, he enslaved Enrique of Malacca.
- Bertrand-François Mahé de La Bourdonnais (1699–1753), naval officer and administrator of Isle de France (Mauritius) and Réunion for the French East India Company.
- William Mahone (1826–1895), railroad builder, Confederate general and U.S. Senator from Virginia. He had owned slaves but joined the bi-racial Readjuster Party after the Civil War.
- John Lawrence Manning (1816–1889), 65th Governor of South Carolina, in 1860 he kept more than 600 people as slaves.
- Francis Marion (1732–1795), Revolutionary War general, most of the people he enslaved escaped and fought with the British.
- Joseph Marryat (1757–1824), owned slaves in Grenada, Trinidad, St. Lucia, and Jamaica. MP for Horsham in 1808 and Sandwich (1812–1824).
- John Marshall (1755–1835), 4th Chief Justice of the United States Supreme Court, he owned between seven and sixteen household slaves at various times.
- George Mason (1725–1792), Virginia planter, politician, and delegate to the U.S. Constitutional Convention of 1787.
- Thomas Massie (c. 1675–1731), Virginia planter and politician who served in the Virginia House of Burgesses.
- Thomas Massie (1747–1834), Virginia planter, military officer in the American Revolution, and son of burgess William Massie.
- William Massie (1718–1751), Virginia planter and politician who served in the House of Burgesses. Son of burgess Thomas Massie.
- Joseph Matamata (born 1953/4), Samoan chief convicted in New Zealand of enslaving fellow Samoans.
- Catharine Flood McCall (1766–1828) was one of a handful of women—like Martha Washington and Annie Henry Christian—who oversaw significant business operations that relied on slave labor in the United States in the late 1700s and early 1800s.
- Carrie Winder McGavock (1829–1905), caretaker of the McGavock Confederate Cemetery in Franklin, Tennessee. Her father, Van Perkins Winder, gave her one slave at marriage, Mariah Reddick, and four more a few years later.
- John McGavock (1815–1893), Louisiana plantation owner and private secretary to Attorney General Felix Grundy. Mariah Reddick was enslaved by McGavock and continued to work for his family after the Civil War.
- James McGill (1744–1813), Scottish businessman and founder of Montreal's McGill University, was a slave owner.
- Henry Middleton (1717–1784), 2nd President of the Continental Congress, he enslaved about 800 people in South Carolina.
- John Milledge (1757–1818), U.S. Congressman and 26th Governor of Georgia, he enslaved more than 100 people in that state.
- Robert Milligan (1746–1809), Scottish merchant and shipowner. At the time of his death, he enslaved 526 people on his Jamaica plantations.
- Moctezuma II (c. 1480–1520), the last Aztec emperor; he was reported to have condemned the families of unreliable astrologers to slavery.
- James Monroe (1758–1831), 5th President of the United States, enslaved many people on his Virginia plantations.
- Indro Montanelli (1909–2001), Italian journalist, historian, and writer, he bought an Eritrean child and kept her as a sex slave.
- Frank A. Montgomery (1830–1903), American politician and Confederate cavalry officer.
- Jackson Morton (1794–1874), Florida politician. Five men whom he enslaved attempted to escape when he threatened to move them to Alabama.
- William Moultrie (1730–1805), revolutionary general and Governor of South Carolina, he enslaved more than 200 people on his plantation.
- Lydia Mugambe (born 1975), Ugandan lawyer who served as a judge at the High Court of Uganda as well as the International Residual Mechanism for Criminal Tribunals enslaved a Ugandan woman.
- Muhammad (c. 570–632), Arab religious, social, and political leader and founder of Islam; he bought, sold, captured, and owned enslaved people and established rules to regulate and restrict slavery.
- Hercules Mulligan (1740–1825), tailor and spy during the American Revolutionary War, his slave, Cato, was his accomplice in espionage. After the war, Mulligan became an abolitionist.
- Mansa Musa (c. 1280 – c. 1337), ruler of the Mali Empire; 12,000 slaves reportedly accompanied him on his Hajj.
- Mustafa (c. 1708 – c. 1751/1763), Ottoman Pasha of Rhodes who was captured by his own slaves during the Lupa revolt in January 1748. In recognition of his high rank, he was subsequently attended by slaves even while he was himself formally enslaved in Malta until May 1749.

== N ==
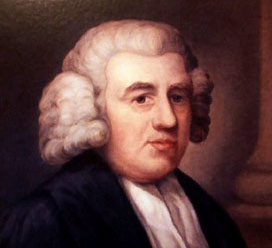
John Newton captained slave ships and was enslaved himself in Sierra Leone. He became an abolitionist, calling the African slave trade "this stain of our National character".

- Cosmana Navarra (c. 1600–1687), Maltese noblewoman and art patron who also owned slaves.
- John Newton (1725–1807), British slave trader and later abolitionist.
- Nicias (c. 470–413 BCE), Athenian politician and general. Plutarch recorded that he enslaved more than 1,000 people in his silver mines.
- Nikarete of Corinth (fl. 5th and 4th century BC), she bought young girls from the Corinthian slave market and trained them as hetaera.

== O ==
- Susannah Ostrehan (died 1809), Barbadian businesswoman, herself a freed slave, she bought some slaves (including her own family) in order to free them, but kept others to labor on her properties.
- Paul Henry Ourry (1719–1783), Royal Navy officer, his enslaved servant Boston Jersey served as a crew member aboard three of the ships on which Ourry sailed.
- James Owen (1784–1865), American politician, planter, major-general and businessman, he owned the enslaved scholar Omar ibn Said.

== P ==
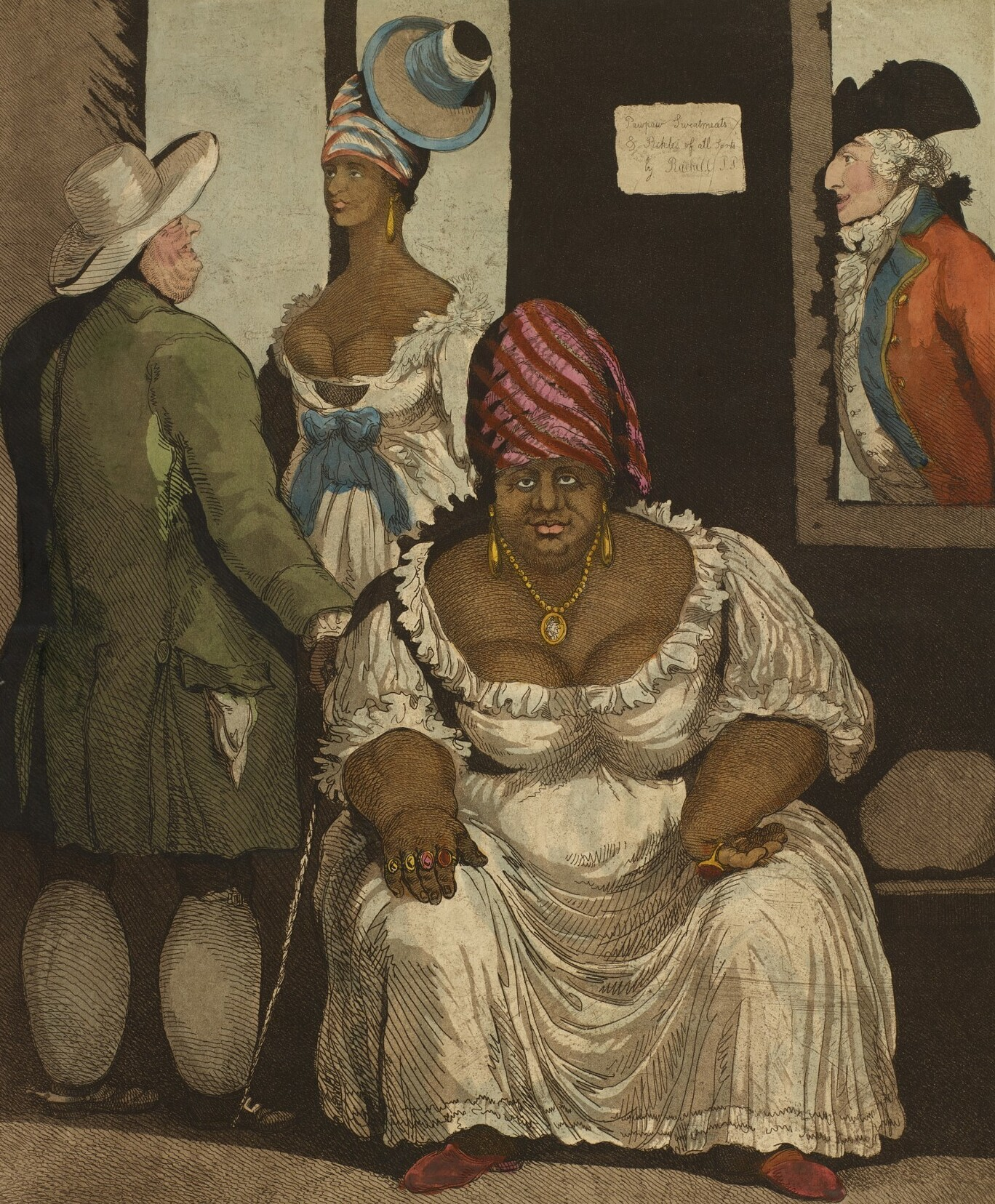
Rachael Pringle Polgreen, Afro-Barbadian hotelier and brothel-owner

- John Page (1628–1692), Virginia merchant and agent for the slave-trading Royal African Company.
- Suzanne Amomba Paillé (c. 1673–1755), African-Guianan slave, slave owner and planter.
- Charles Nicholas Pallmer (1772–1848), British Member of Parliament and Jamaican plantation owner.
- George Palmer (1772–1853), English businessman and politician. As a slave owner, he received compensation when slavery was abolished in Grenada.
- William Penn (1644–1718), founder of Pennsylvania, he owned many slaves.
- Richard Pennant, 1st Baron Penrhyn (1737–1808), owned six sugar plantations in Jamaica and was an outspoken anti-abolitionist.
- John J. Pettus (1813–1867), 20th and 23rd Governor of Mississippi, enslaved 24 people on his farm.
- Judith Philip (c. 1760 – 1848) was a free, Afro-Grenadian business woman who amassed one of the largest estates in Grenada. By the time Britain emancipated slaves in the West Indies she owned 275 slaves and was compensated 6,603 pounds sterling, one of the largest settlements in the colony.
- Thomas Phillips, (1760–1851), founder of Llandovery College and a slave owner.
- John Pinney (1740–1818), a British merchant, he inherited a sugar plantation on Nevis at age 22 and bought dozens of enslaved people to work it.
- Plato, (428/427 or 424/423 – 348/347 BCE), Athenian philosopher, reported to have owned several slaves.
- Susanna du Plessis (1739–1795), planter in Dutch Surinam, legendary for her cruelty.
- Vedius Pollio (died 15 BCE), a Roman aristocrat remembered for being exceedingly cruel to his slaves.
- James K. Polk (1795–1849), 11th President of the United States, he owned slaves most of his adult life.
- Leonidas Polk (1806–1864), Episcopal bishop and Confederate general, he enslaved people on his Tennessee plantation.
- Samuel Polk (1772–1827), father of President James K. Polk.
- Sarah Childress Polk (1803–1891), First lady, wife of James K. Polk, one of the first female plantation owners in Tennessee.
- Alexander Porter (1785–1844), U.S. Senator from Louisiana, judge and plantation owner at Oaklawn Manor.
- Mattia Preti (1613–1699), Italian artist and Hospitaller knight, who while in Malta owned a slave who modelled for his paintings.
- Rachael Pringle Polgreen (1753–1791), Afro-Barbadian hotelier and brothel owner. Emancipated herself, she had a violent temper and abused her own slaves.

== Q ==
- John A. Quitman (1798–1858), Mississippi politician and prominent member of the pro-slavery Fire-Eaters.

== R ==
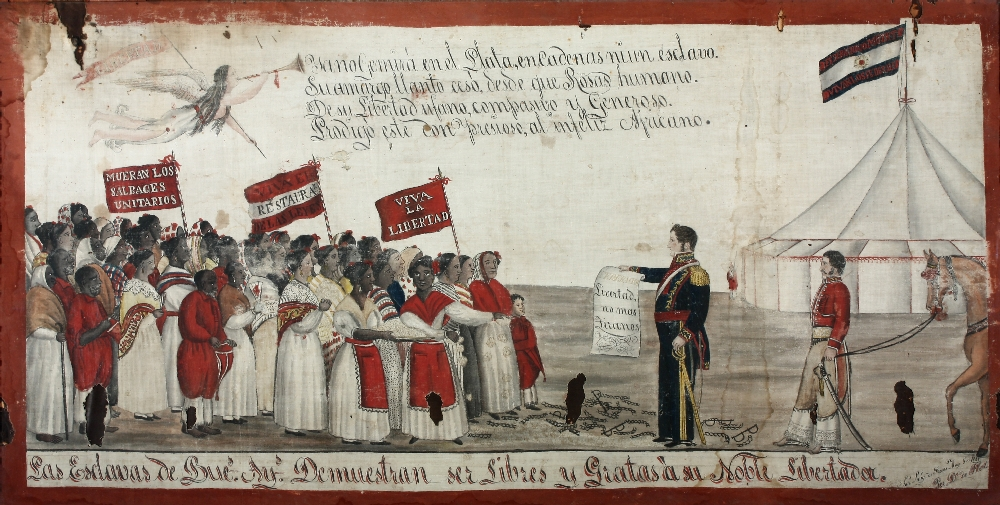
"The slaves of Buenos Aires praising their noble liberator." In fact, de Rosas revived the slave trade and owned slaves himself.

- Edmund Randolph (1753–1813), American statesman. Eight of his slaves were freed by the Gradual Abolition Act of 1780.
- John Randolph (1773–1833), American statesman and planter, and one of the founders of the American Colonization Society.
- John Reynolds (1788–1865), 4th governor of Illinois, owned seven slaves whom he emancipated over 20 years.
- George R. Reeves (1826–1882), Texas sheriff, colonel, legislator, and Speaker of the Texas House of Representatives, and was also the owner of Bass Reeves, who later became a notable lawman.
- Daniel Robertson (1733–1810), British Army officer in North America, manumitted Pierre Bonga and his parents at Mackinac Island, as well as Hilaire Lamour in Montreal, but insisted that Lamour pay for the release of his wife Catherine in 1787.
- Thomas B. Robertson (1779–1828) American politician who served as Attorney General of the Orleans Territory, Secretary of the Louisiana Territory, a United States representative from Louisiana, the 3rd Governor of Louisiana. Purchased "Eliza" in 1817 from Austin Woolfolk.
- William Barton Rogers (1804–1882), American scientist and founder of MIT, he enslaved at least six people, including Isabella Gibbons.
- Juan Manuel de Rosas (1793–1877), Governor of Buenos Aires Province who oversaw the revival of the slave trade in Argentina.
- Mary Johnston Rose (1718–1783), free person of color and hotelier on Jamaica, possibly born a slave, and later a slave owner herself.
- Isaac Ross (1760–1836), Mississippi planter who stipulated in his will that his slaves be freed and moved to Africa.
- Anne Rossignol (1730–1810), Afro-French slave trader.
- Isaac Royall Jr. (1719–1781), a colonial American landowner who played an important role in the creation of Harvard Law School.
- Peter Russell (1733–1808), gambler, government official, politician and judge in Upper Canada.
- John Rutledge (1739–1800), 2nd Chief Justice of the United States, he enslaved as many as sixty people at one time.

== S ==
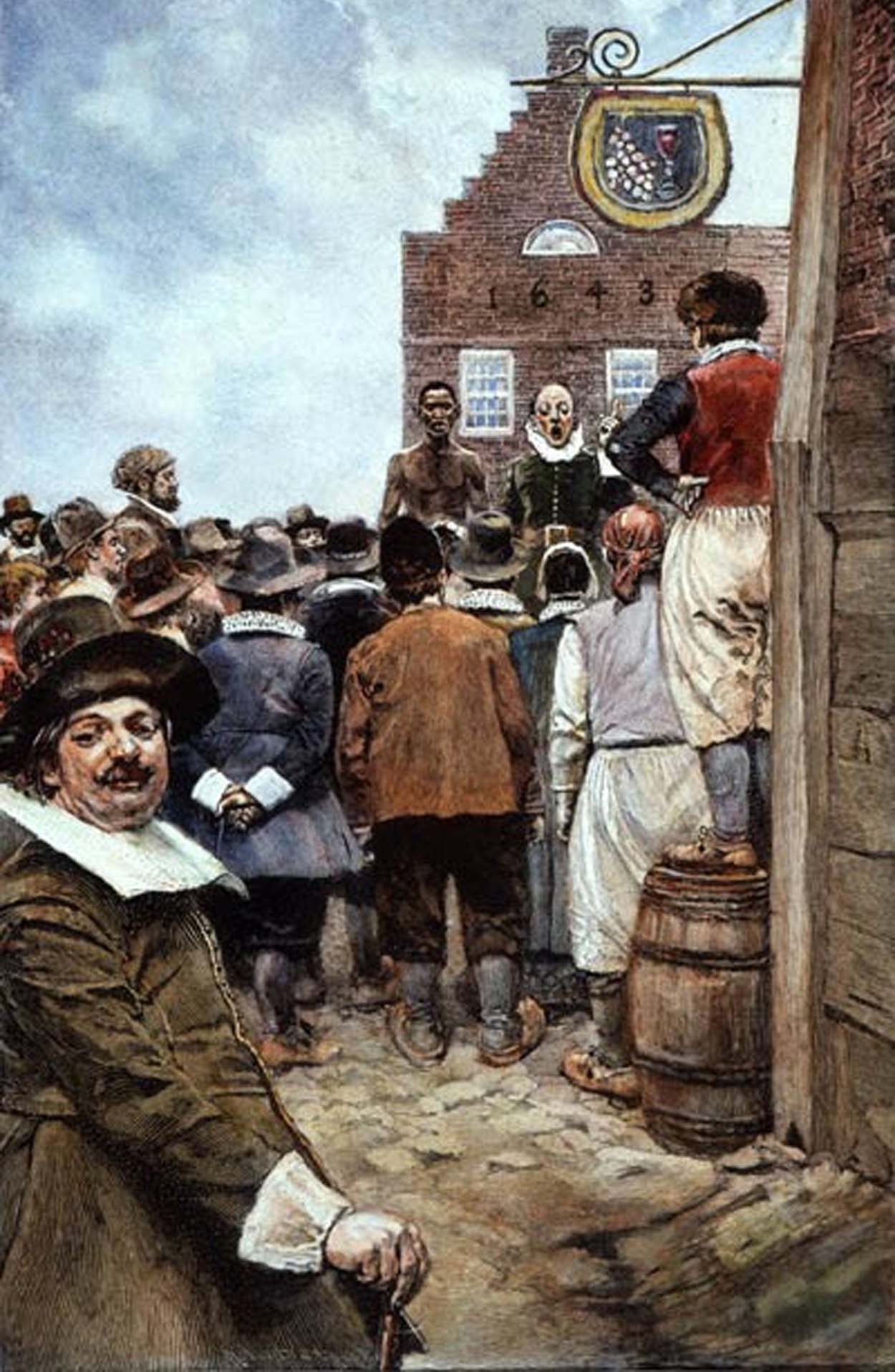
1895 illustration depicting the c. 1655 slave-auction organized by Peter Stuyvesant

- Elisabeth Samson (1715–1771), Surinamese plantation owner and daughter of a formerly enslaved woman.
- Ana Joaquina dos Santos e Silva (1788–1859), Afro-Portuguese slave trader in Angola.
- Ibn Saud (1875–1953), regulated slavery in Saudi Arabia in 1936 and brought his slaves to his 1945 meeting with U.S. President Franklin D. Roosevelt.
- Caterina Scappi (died 1643), Italian businesswoman and benefactor who while on Malta owned at least one slave whom she freed upon her death.
- Ernst Heinrich von Schimmelmann (1747–1831), Danish politician and planter, he opposed the Atlantic slave trade but supported slavery, owning enslaved people in both Copenhagen and his Saint Croix plantation.
- Sally Seymour (died 1824), American pastry chef and restaurateur, formerly a slave.
- J. Marion Sims (1813–1883), physician, founder of gynecology. He performed medical experiments on enslaved women whom he bought or rented.
- Philip Skene (1725–1810), Scottish British army officer and New York state patroon who fought in the Saratoga campaign
- Ashbel Smith (1805–1886), physician, diplomat, slave owner, Republic of Texas official, Confederate officer and first President of the Board of Regents of the University of Texas. An anti-abolitionist, he helped lead efforts to keep Texas a republic and slave state.
- Emilia Soares de Patrocinio (1805–1886) was a Brazilian slave, slave owner and businesswoman.
- Hernando de Soto (c. 1500–1542), explorer and conquistador, he enslaved many of the indigenous people he encountered in North America. At the time of his death he owned four enslaved people.
- Samuel Sprigg (c. 1783–1855), the 17th governor of the state of Maryland, owned 40 enslaved people according to the 1840 census.
- Stephen the Great (c. 1430s–1504), Moldavian prince, he consolidated his country's practice of slavery, including the notion that different laws applied to slaves, reportedly enslaving as many as 17,000 Roma during his invasion of Wallachia.
- Alexander H. Stephens (1812–1883), Vice President of the Confederate States of America and proponent for the expansion of slavery.
- Charles Stewart (fl. 1740s–1770s), Scottish-American customs officer who enslaved James Somerset. In 1772, while in England, Somerset successfully sued for his freedom. The judgment in Somerset v Stewart effectively ended slavery in Britain.
- David Stuart (1753–1814), Virginia politician and correspondent of George Washington used enslaved people on his plantations; a 1787 tax census shows 13 adult and 9 child slaves in his possession.
- J. E. B. Stuart (1833–1864), Confederate general. He and his wife enslaved two people.
- John Stuart (1740–1811) was an American Anglican minister who later practiced in Kingston, Upper Canada.
- Peter Stuyvesant (c. 1592–1672), director-general of New Netherland, he organized Manhattan's first slave-auction and enslaved 40 African people himself.
- Thomas Sumter (1734–1832), South Carolina planter and general, in the Revolutionary War he gifted slaves to new recruits as an incentive to enlist.
- Mary Surratt (1823–1865), convicted conspirator in the assassination of Abraham Lincoln and the first woman executed by the U.S. federal government. She and her husband were slaveholders.

== T ==
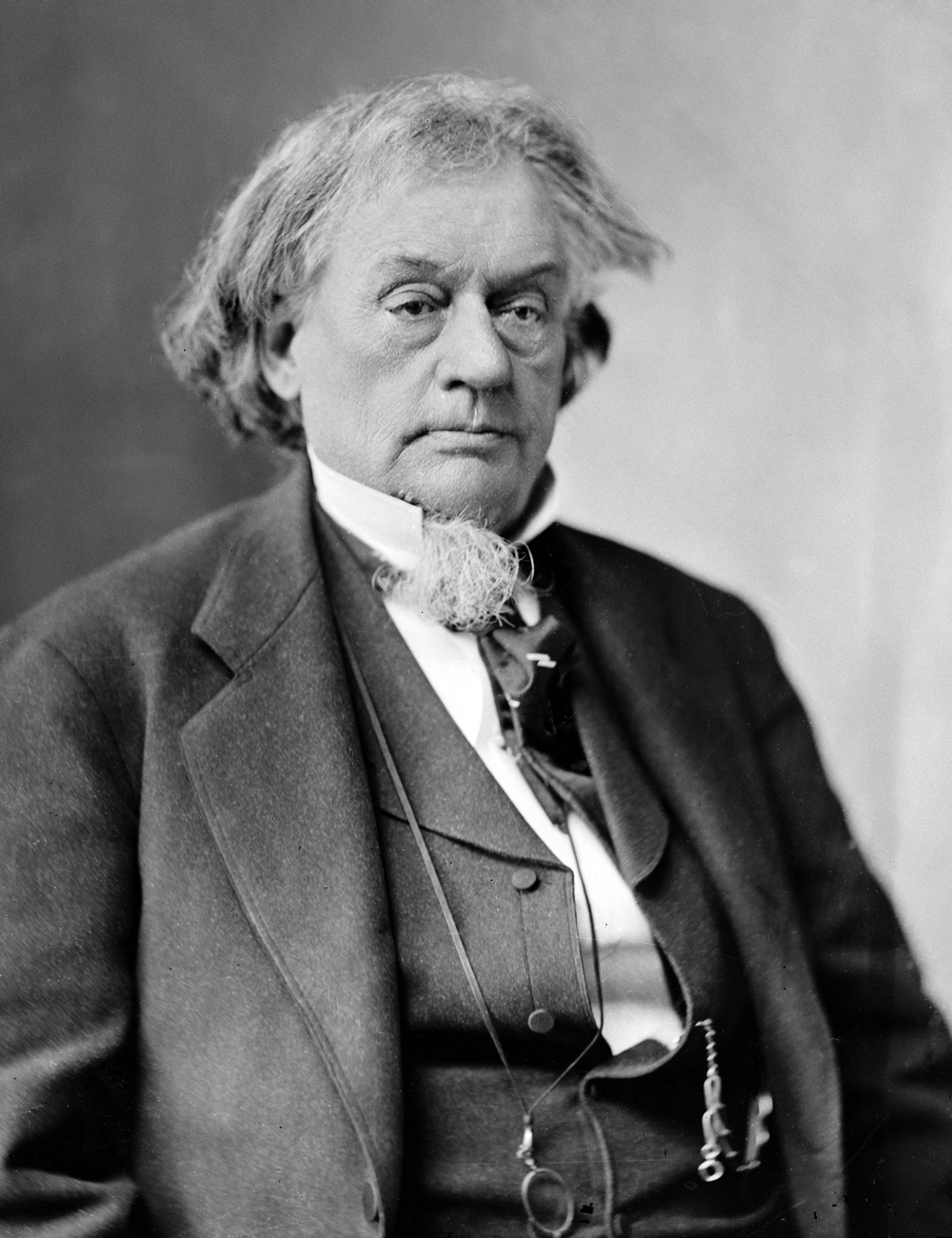
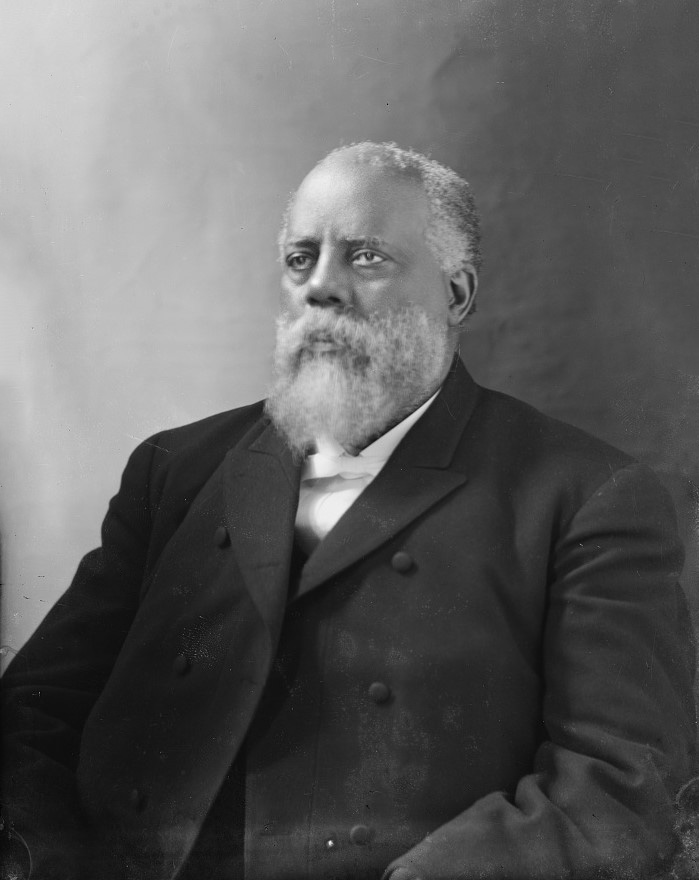
Robert Toombs (left) and one of the men he enslaved, Bishop Wesley John Gaines (right)
- Clemente Tabone (c. 1575–1665), Maltese landowner who owned at least two slaves.
- Lawrence Taliaferro (1794–1871), Indian agent who enslaved Harriet Robinson and officiated her marriage to Dred Scott. The largest slaveholder in what is now Minnesota, Taliaferro leased slaves to officers at Fort Snelling.
- Roger Taney (1777–1864), 5th Chief Justice of the United States Supreme Court, as a young man he inherited slaves from his father but quickly emancipated them.
- John Tayloe II (1721–1779), Virginia planter and politician, he enslaved approximately 250 people.
- George Taylor (c. 1716–1781), Pennsylvania ironmaster and signer of the Declaration of Independence, he enslaved two men who, upon his death, were sold to settle his debts.
- Zachary Taylor (1784–1850), 12th President of the United States, he enslaved as many as 200 people on his Cypress Grove Plantation.
- Edward Telfair (1735–1807), 19th Governor of Georgia and a slave owner.
- Thomas Thistlewood (1721–1786), British planter in Jamaica, he recorded torturing and raping slaves in his diary.
- George Henry Thomas (1816–1870), Union General in the American Civil War, he owned slaves during much of his life.
- Madam Tinubu (1810–1887), Nigerian aristocrat and slave trader.
- Tippu Tip (1832–1905), Zanzabari slave trader.
- Tiradentes (1746–1792), Brazilian revolutionary.
- Alex Tizon (1959–2017), Pulitzer Prize winner and author of "My Family's Slave".
- Robert Toombs (1810–1885), U.S. Congressman, 1st Confederate Secretary of State, and brigadier general in the Confederate Army. He owned many slaves on his plantations, including Garland H. White, William Gaines and Wesley John Gaines.
- George Trenholm (1807–1876), American financier, he enslaved hundreds of people on his plantations and in his household.
- Homaidan Al-Turki (born 1969), Colorado resident convicted in 2006 of enslaving and abusing his housekeeper.
- John Tyler (1790–1862), 10th President of the United States, was 23 when he inherited his father's Virginia plantation and 13 slaves.

== U ==
- Umayya ibn Khalaf (died 624), Arab chieftain who, according to tradition, tortured his slave, Bilal ibn Rabah, for converting to Islam.

== V ==
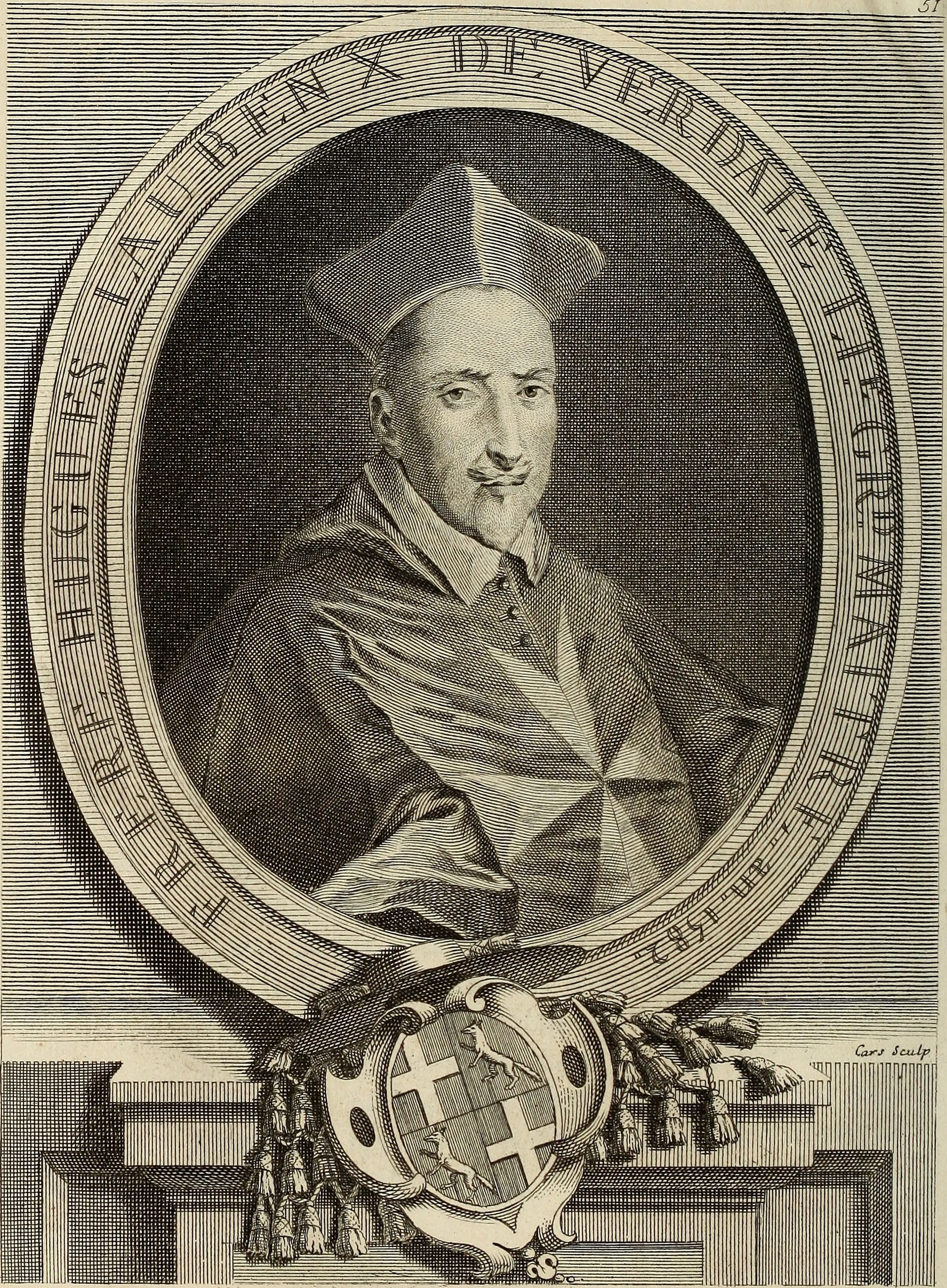
Hugues Loubenx de Verdalle

- Martin Van Buren (1782–1862), 8th President of the United States and later a vocal abolitionist, owned at least one enslaved person and apparently leased others while he lived in Washington.
- Joseph H. Vann (1798–1844), Cherokee leader with hundreds of slaves in Indian Territory.
- Diego Velázquez (1599–1660), Spanish painter, he enslaved Juan de Pareja who was his assistant and a notable painter himself.
- Hugues Loubenx de Verdalle (1531–1595), French Grand Master of the Knights Hospitaller and cardinal, who owned 230 slaves at the time of his death.
- Amerigo Vespucci (1451–1512), Italian explorer and eponym of America, his estate held five slaves at his death.
- Jacques Villeré (1761–1830), Governor of Louisiana. 53 people he had enslaved were liberated by the British after the Battle of New Orleans.
- Elisabeth Dieudonné Vincent (1798–1883), a Haitian-born free businesswoman of color who, along with her husband, owned slaves in New Orleans.
- Caterina Vitale (1566–1619), Maltese pharmacist and chemist who owned slaves; upon her death most of her estate was bequeathed to the Monte della Redenzione degli Schiavi, a charity which funded the ransoming of slaves.

== W ==
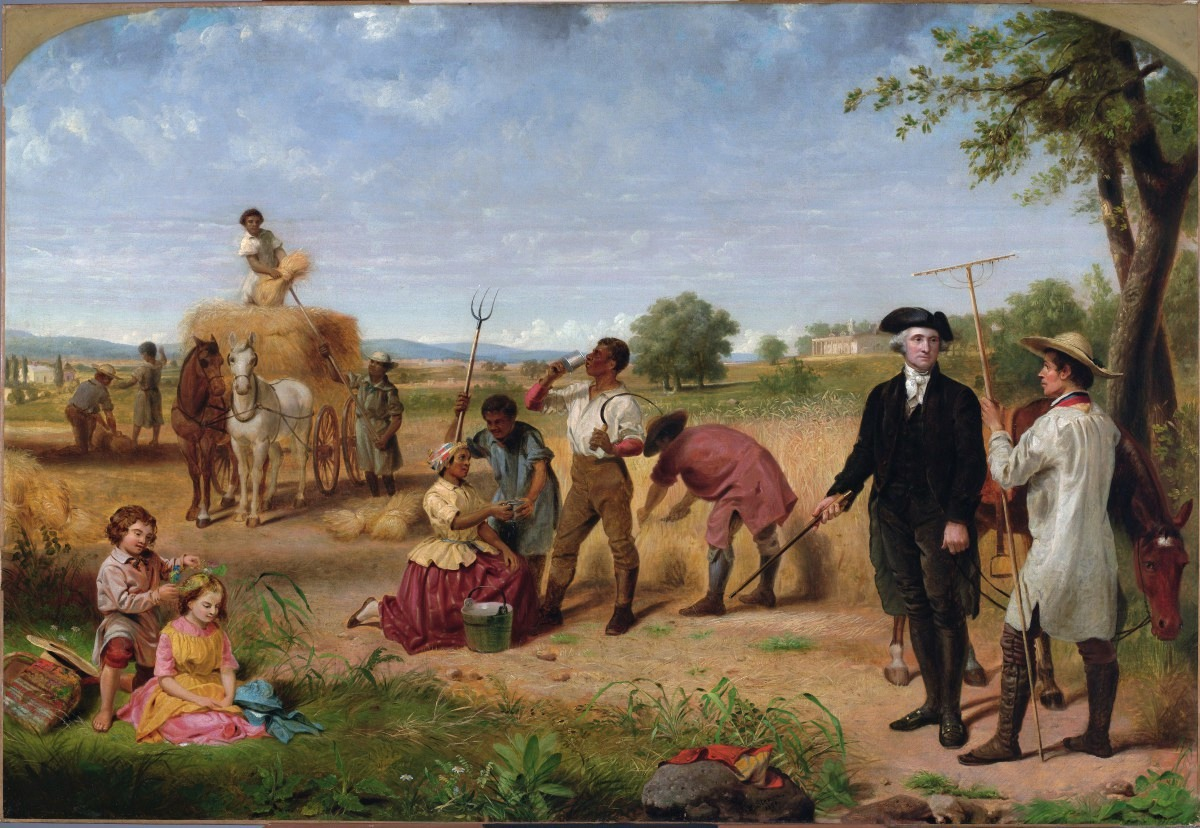
Life of George Washington: The Farmer (1851); his slaves harvest grain behind him.

- Walkara (c. 1805–1855), leader in the Timpanogos Native American group in what is now Utah, enslaved other Native Americans (typically Paiute or Goshute) many of whom he traded to California or New Mexico.
- Joshua John Ward (1800–1853), Lieutenant Governor of South Carolina and "the king of the rice planters", whose estate was once the largest slaveholder in the United States (1,130 slaves).
- Robert Wash (1790–1856), Missouri Supreme Court Justice. A slave-owner himself, he dissented in several important freedom suits.
- Augustine Washington (1694–1743), father of George Washington. At the time of his death he owned 64 people.
- George Washington (1732–1799), 1st President of the United States, who owned as many as 300 people. In his last will and testament he set all his slaves free.
- Martha Washington (1731–1802), 1st U.S. First Lady, inherited slaves upon the death of her first husband and later gave slaves to her grandchildren as wedding gifts.
- John Wayles (1715–1773), English slave trader and father-in-law of Thomas Jefferson.
- James Moore Wayne (1790–1867), U.S. Congressman and Associate Justice of the United States Supreme Court who owned slaves and had three children by an enslaved woman.
- Thomas H. Watts (1819–1892), 18th Governor of Alabama and slave owner.
- John Wedderburn of Ballindean (1729–1803), Scottish landowner whose slave, Joseph Knight, successfully sued for his freedom.
- Richard Wenman (c. 1712–1781). Nova Scotia politician and brewer. One of his slaves, Cato, attempted to escape in 1778.
- John H. Wheeler (1806–1882), U.S. Cabinet official and North Carolina planter. In separate, well-publicized incidents, two women he enslaved, Jane Johnson and Hannah Bond, escaped from him and both gained their freedom.
- William Whipple (1730–1785), American general and politician, signer of the Declaration of Independence, and slave trader.
- George Whitefield (1714–1770), English Methodist preacher who successfully campaigned to legalize slavery in Georgia.
- James Matthew Whyte (c. 1788–1843), Canadian banker, he enslaved at least a dozen people on a plantation in Jamaica.
- James Beckford Wildman (1789–1867), English MP and owner of Jamaican plantations.
- John Witherspoon (1723–1794), Scottish-American Presbyterian minister, Founding Father of the United States, president of the College of New Jersey (now Princeton University). At the time of his death, he owned "two slaves...valued at a hundred dollars each".
- John Winthrop (1587/88–1649), one of the leading figures in founding the Massachusetts Bay Colony and the 3rd Governor of Massachusetts. He enslaved two Pequot people.
- Joseph Wragg (1698–1751), British-American merchant and politician. He and his partner Benjamin Savage were among the first colonial merchants and ship owners to specialize in the slave trade.
- Wynflaed (died c. 950/960), an Anglo-Saxon noblewoman, she bequeathed a male cook named Aelfsige to her granddaughter Eadgifu.
- George Wythe (1726–1807), American legal scholar, U.S. Declaration of Independence signatory. He freed his slaves late in his life.

== Y ==
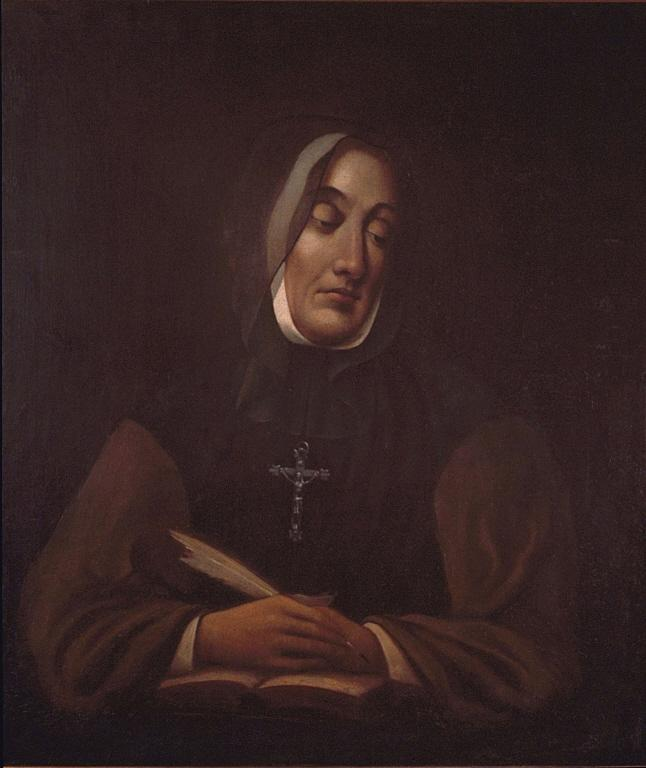
Marguerite d'Youville, first native-born Canadian saint, used slaves in her hospital

- William Lowndes Yancey (1814–1863), American secessionist leader, he was gifted 36 people as a dowry and established a plantation where he forced them to work.
- Marie-Marguerite d'Youville (1701–1771), the first person born in Canada to be declared a saint and "one of Montreal's more prominent slaveholders".
- David Levy Yulee (1810–1886), American politician and attorney, he forced enslaved people to work his Florida sugarcane plantation and later to build a railroad.

== Z ==
- Juan de Zaldívar (1514–1570), Spanish official and explorer, he enslaved many people on his farms and mines in New Spain.

== See also ==
- Centre for the Study of the Legacies of British Slavery
- List of presidents of the United States who owned slaves
- List of slaves
- Slavery among the indigenous peoples of the Americas
- Bibliography of slavery in the United States
