= Thomas Massie (disambiguation) =

Thomas Massie (born 1971) is a U.S. representative from Kentucky.

Thomas Massie may also refer to:

- Thomas Massie (burgess) (1675–1731) member of the Virginia House of Burgesses
- Thomas Massie (planter) (1747–1834), American Revolutionary War veteran and planter from Virginia
- Thomas Leeke Massie (1802–1898), admiral in the British Navy
- Thomas Massie, see Massie Trial

== See also ==
- Thomas Massey (disambiguation)
