= Enslavers =

Enslavers may refer to:

- List of slave owners
- Slavery
- Enslavers, an expansion for the 1998 video game StarCraft
