= William Massie =

American politician

Member of the Virginia House of Burgesses representing New Kent County, Virginia
- In office 1748–1749 Serving with William Hockaday
- Preceded by: William Gray
- Succeeded by: James Power

Personal details
- Born: May 28, 1718 New Kent, Virginia
- Died: June 4, 1751 (aged 32–33) Putneys Mill, New Kent County, Colony of Virginia
- Resting place: New Kent, Virginia
- Spouse: Martha Lucy (Macon) Bland
- Children: William Massie and Maj. Thomas Massie
- Parent(s): Thomas Massie, Mary Walker
- Occupation: planter, legislator

William Massie (1718-1751) was a colonial Virginia planter and politician who served in the Virginia House of Burgesses. A descendant of the same name served a single term in the Virginia House of Delegates in 1839-1840, representing Nelson County considerably westward of this man's lands,

== Early life ==
William Massie was born May 28, 1718 to Thomas Massie and Mary Massie (née Walker). His father, Thomas, had more than doubled the acreage acquired by his father, Peter Massie, who had emigrated from the Liverpool area of northwest England and begun the family's political contributions by serving as a road surveyor for New Kent County. Thomas served as a captain in the militia and member of the House of Burgesses from 1723 until 1729.

== Career ==
Like his father, William Massie served as a vestryman in the local church, and church warden after his father's death.

== Personal life ==
He married Martha Macon (1722-1759), daughter of Col. William Macon (b. 1694), who after his death married Burgess (and later prominent patriot) Richard Bland. The Macons were Huguenots, and Col. Macon's father Gideon Macon had emigrated to the Virginia colony from France and established a New Kent County plantation known as Prospect Hill. Their son Thomas would rise to the rank of Major in the Continental Army, serving with distinction in campaigns in Pennsylvania and New Jersey early in the conflict, as well as during the Yorktown campaign near its end, and establish the family considerably upstream on the James River in the Tye River area that became Nelson County.
