= Susannah Ostrehan =

Susannah Ostrehan (died 1809) was a Barbadian businesswoman who owned a number of properties in Bridgetown. She was a freed slave, and acquired a number of slaves herself, many of which were friends or family she purchased in order to expedite their manumission.

== Early life ==
Ostrehan was born into slavery. Her mother Priscilla had several other children and was owned by the Ostrehan family, who had been on the island since the 1600s and were prominent members of the plantocracy. Ostrehan was a mulatta, likely fathered by her mother's owner or one of his relatives. It is unclear at what point she was freed, but it occurred relatively early in her life; her mother and siblings remained enslaved.

== Holdings ==
=== Property ===
By 1779, Ostrehan owned two houses in central Bridgetown, one on Reed Street and one on Back Church Street (now Suttle Street). Their tax assessment had increased significantly by the following year, suggesting substantial improvements had been made to the properties. Ostrehan continued to expand her property holdings over the following decades, and even expanded into other colonies – in 1799, she bought two seafront lots in St. George's, the capital of Grenada, which she had previously been renting. There is no definite evidence of what the properties were used for, but at least some of them were likely to have been hotels or boardinghouses.

=== Slaves ===
As was common for free blacks, Ostrehan assisted enslaved people once she had the means to do so. Some of the people she owned were family members, including her mother and probably her siblings – she "clearly felt that personal ownership of her family members was the safest option in a society ruled by private property". Others she purchased solely in order to free. Barbados had extremely strict manumission laws at the time, which had been imposed in order to limit the number of free blacks on the island. Owners had to pay £200 for male slaves and £300 for female slaves, and also had to show cause to the local authorities. It was often cheaper to manumit in other colonies, and Ostrehan assisted manumissions in Grenada, Dominica, and Berbice at various times. She also used agents to manumit family members, like her mother and niece Elizabeth Swain Bannister, in London. She kept slaves to work on her properties, and no attempts to free them were made before her death.

== Death and estate ==
By the time of her death in late 1809, Ostrehan's wealth was concentrated in "two very large houses" in Bridgetown, which were valued at a combined total of £2,850. The total value of her estate was around £4,000, which included several smaller properties, household effects (mahogany furniture, silverware, porcelain), and thirteen slaves. Ostrehan had no children of her own, and willed most of her fortune to her two nieces, Mary and Susannah II.

Her mother was still enslaved at the time of her death, and thus unable to inherit property; she was willed to a friend, Christian Blackman, with instructions to free her and provide her a house. Four white acquaintances received £100 each, demonstrating the extent of her connections in Barbadian society. Ostrehan's nieces carried on the same line of business, operating hotels in the new colonies of Demerara and Berbice; Susannah II continued to own slaves up until the abolition of slavery in 1833, and received compensation for her loss.

== See also ==
- Amaryllis Collymore
- Rachael Pringle Polgreen
- Dorothy Thomas (entrepreneur)
