= Amaryllis Collymore =

Afro-Barbadian slave, plantation owner and businesswoman

- Born: Amaryllis Renn Phillips c. 1745; Barbados, British West Indies
- Died: 1828 (aged 82–83)
- Other names: Amarillis Collymore, Amarillis Colymore
- Occupations: plantation owner and businesswoman
- Years active: 1784–1829

Amaryllis Collymore (c. 1745–1828) was an Afro-Barbadian slave who gained her freedom from her relationship with a white man. The couple had eleven children and she successfully ran a plantation allowing her to acquire numerous other properties, to become the wealthiest free black woman in the colony at the time of her death.

== Life ==
Amaryllis Renn Phillips was born into slavery in 1745 (Note: If her tombstone is correct that she was 78 years old at her death, she may have been born in 1750; however, as the date of 1745 is given by Dr. Karl Watson, the president of the Barbados National Trust, that date was used.) on Barbados, during British colonial rule where records indicate she was a mulatto. She was purchased by Robert Collymore in 1780, from Rebecca Phillips, a free coloured hotelier, along with her five mulatto children, four of whom were Robert's children. In 1784, Robert arranged their manumission by selling her and the children to a friend, James Scuffield. Selling a slave to a trusted third-party to avoid high manumission fees was a common practice during the period in Barbados.

Robert acquired Lightfoots, a 42-acre sugar plantation with its 44 slaves, to provide for her and the children. Collymore expanded the estate to over a hundred acres and was able to buy seven properties throughout Bridgetown, on Canary Street, High Street and James Street, which she rented out. She also ran a successful shop. By 1805, Collymore owned another property, on Roebuck Street, which she sold for £800. She and her daughter, Katherine Anne Collymore, were the recipients of a bequest from Renn Phillips in his 1809 will.

In 1824, when Robert died, he bequeathed she and her eleven children, full title to Lightfoots and the slaves working on the plantation. Among her children, besides Katherine were Frances Lasley, Margaret Jane, and Robert (baptized 18 February 1792), Thomazin Ashby (baptized 6 June 1795), Elizabeth Clarke (baptized 13 June 1798), Samuel Francis Collymore, Jackson Brown Collymore and Renn Phillips Collymore, who would become the great-great grandfather of Frank Collymore. Collymore's will, dated 1826 (or 1829 but which was probably the date the estate was probated), left her estate, worth over £10,000 to relatives. She devised a home in Bridgetown and a plantation known as Haggat Hall, and 67 slaves, as well as silver and personal property. At the time of her death she was "the richest free woman of color in pre-emancipation Barbados".

== Death and legacy ==
Collymore died on 16 December 1828 and was buried in the St. Mary's Churchyard in Bridgetown. The house that Collymore and her children occupied is now the Morningside Building, and houses the Arts Department of the Barbados Community College.

== See also ==
Other former enslaved women who became slave-owners in Barbados:

- Rachael Pringle Polgreen
- Susannah Ostrehan
- Dorothy Thomas (entrepreneur)
