= Thomas Massey =

Thomas Massey or Tom Massey may refer to:

- Thomas Massey (Australian politician), Australian politician
- Tom Massey (American politician)
- Thomas Massey (MP) for City of Chester (UK Parliament constituency)
- Thomas Massey House
- Thomas Hacket Massey, who built Massey's Folly

== See also ==
- Thomas Massie (disambiguation)
