= Margaret Hutton =

Pennsylvania enslaver

- Born: August 19, 1727; Prince George's County, Maryland, US
- Died: c1797 Washington Township, Fayette County, Pennsylvania, US
- Known for: largest enslaver in Pennsylvania at the time of the first federal census
- Spouse: Richard Hutton
- Children: Mary Hutton
- Relatives: William Goe (brother), Hezekiah Magruder (son-in-law)

Margaret Hutton (née Goe; August 19, 1727 – c1797) was an early settler colonist in southwestern Pennsylvania and the largest enslaver in the state at the time of the first federal census in 1790. Hutton registered nine people as lifetime slaves in 1780 and sixteen children as term slaves between 1788 and her death in 1797. The 1790 census identified twenty-four enslaved people in her household. Her 1795 last will and testament identified twenty-six enslaved people by name. All told, Hutton enslaved at least thirty-six people during her lifetime.

== Early life and family ==
Margaret Goe was born on August 19, 1727, in Prince George's County, Maryland, to William Goe and Mary Boyd. She married Richard Hutton and the couple had a daughter they named Mary. When Richard died in 1772, he bequeathed to Mary a boy named Edward Simpson and a girl named Hannah. When Mary Hutton married Hezekiah Magruder, Mary and Edward became his property under the law of coverture.

The Goes, Huttons, and Magruders moved to southwestern Pennsylvania in 1773, settling near Redstone Creek in what is now Fayette County along with between twenty and thirty enslaved people they brought from Maryland. The death of Margaret's husband, followed by her son-in-law in 1787, left Hutton one of the wealthiest women in the region, as she inherited land and enslaved people from both men.

== Slaveholding ==
Genealogist Tony Burroughs identifies at least thirty-six people whom Hutton held in bondage during her lifetime. Their names are as follows: "Old Catherine," "Old Rachel," "Old Jeremiah," Tobias, Hannah, William Edward Simpson, Thomas Simpson, Sarah, Susannah, Alice, Isaac, Philimona, Terrementa, Alice, Henriette, Abram, Rachel, Cassandra, David, Benjamin, Henry Fitz Edward, Leah, Priscilla, Charles David, Robert, Anna, Rebecca, Jamima, Daniel, Ester, William, Dinah, Elizabeth, Charity, and George. There were 282 enslaved people in Fayette County in 1790, meaning that the individuals with ties to the Goe, Hutton, and Magruder families constituted a significant percentage of the region's Black community.

In her last will and testament, Hutton bequeathed a variety of tools to the people she enslaved, including axes, hoes, sickles, scythes, and ploughs for the men, as well as spinning wheels, pots, kettles, and skillets for the women. Hutton also bequeathed various crops and livestock, including corn, wheat, flax, wool, cows, lambs, and pigs. This suggests that the people whom Hutton enslaved labored primarily as farmers and domestic servants. There were some people, however, who had acquired more specialized skills. Henry Fitz Edward and Charles David possessed knowledge of tailoring and shoemaking respectively.

== Death and manumission ==
When Margaret Hutton composed her last will and testament on February 12, 1795, she provided for the conditional manumission of the twenty-six people she still enslaved. She generally allowed that older people should have their freedom within a year of her death, while younger people were to be sold for a period of years before having their freedom. Hutton also allowed most of this group to collect cash and goods from her executors in order to support themselves in freedom. Her decision to leave property to the community she had enslaved during her lifetime helped to establish a free Black community in the Monongahela Valley.

== See also ==
- List of slave owners
- Curtis Grubb
