= Elizabeth Swain Bannister =

Elizabeth Swain Bannister (also known as E. S. Bannister and Elizabeth Swayne Bannister, ch. 22 February 1785 – 1828) was a free woman of colour from Barbados. She gained her freedom when her aunt Susannah Ostrehan manumitted her in 1806. She later moved to Berbice where she lived with her partner William Fraser, conducting business in her own right. She acquired property and over 75 slaves, leaving a legacy to her children, who had been legitimized by their father, of £5,400, (equivalent to £500,000 in 2025, according to calculations based on retail price index measure of inflation.)

== Early life ==
Elizabeth, christened along with her sister Susannah, on 22 February 1785, was born in Saint Michael Parish, Barbados as the daughter of Lydia Ostrehan. She was the niece of Susannah Ostrehan and granddaughter of Priscilla Ostrehan, who was a slave owned by Thomas Ostrehan. On 19 August 1806, Elizabeth, named in the record as Elizabeth Swain Bannister, and two cousins, Henry and Mary, children of Mary Ostrehan, were manumitted by their aunt, Susannah. To secure her freedom, Susannah sold Elizabeth to Captain James White, a prominent seafaring merchant, enlisting his help in obtaining her manumission papers in London. At the time, manumission fees in Barbados were extremely high, £300 for women and £200 for men, as compared to £10 in Dominica or Grenada and £50 in England. To avoid the high cost of Barbadian freedom, those wishing to manumit slaves would find a trustworthy and sympathetic mariner traveling to England to go to the Lord Mayor of London, pay the fee, obtain the paperwork, and return with the certificate.

== Career ==
After obtaining her freedom, Bannister moved to Berbice, a Dutch Colony, in what is now Guyana by 1809. She began a relationship with William Fraser (1787–1830). Fraser had arrived in Berbice in 1803 from Cromarty, Scotland. It is possible that the two had met in Barbados, as Fraser had an older daughter, Anna Maria, with a free woman of colour named Mary Stuart, who was born in Barbados. Bannister and Fraser had four children together, John (1810-ca. 1845), George (1815-after 1859), Elizabeth (died prior to 1822) and Jane (ca. 1821 –ca. 1850)

The couple conducted their businesses separately and Bannister continued to use her own name. The source of her income is unknown, but it is possible that as her Aunt Susannah Ostrehan had owned a hotel, and her own sister, also named Susannah Ostrehan was operating a hotel in Berbice, she may have joined the family business. The slave schedules for 1817 reflect that Fraser owned 26 slaves and had registered 16 other slaves in the names of his children. By 1821, Fraser was the owner of Goldstone Hall, a sugar plantation, which employed 330 slaves. Bannister also frequently appeared in the slave registers, which showed that by 1817, she owned 30 slaves, in 1822, she owned 66 slaves and by 1825 owned 76 slaves.

The couple sent their children to be educated in Scotland in 1823. John and George attended Paisley Grammar School, where John received a scholar's prize in 1827. Jane began her studies in Liverpool and later studied in Glasgow. Recognizing that in Britain his children were seen as illegitimate, Fraser petitioned the Colonial Secretary for letters of legitimation to allow him to bequeath his estate to his offspring. Such legalization was unusual, especially given that as a young man in his thirties, he could have fathered legitimate children. Having secured their rights, he returned to Berbice and continued to live with Bannister until her death in 1828.

== Legacy ==
At her death, Bannister left an estate of £5,400, (equivalent to £500,000 in 2025, according to calculations based on retail price index measure of inflation) to her children, granting Jane, the largest portion, £3,000 (equivalent to £300,000 in 2025). Though their father returned to Scotland, he died two years later, leaving them his estate. He was debt-ridden and settling accounts with his creditors continued until 1846. Bannister's son John Fraser became apprenticed to study surgery in Cromarty, but died in Scotland before 1845. George Fraser returned to South America and managed his father's plantation L'Esperance in Suriname. In 1839, the property was offered for sale, by all three siblings. George died in 1842 and his son, also named George Fraser, inherited the property, along with 96 slaves. He mortgaged the property the following year and later sold it to James Tyndall. Jane married Giles Dixon in 1838 and had a daughter Maria around 1841 in Rothesay. The following year, they relocated to Devon and Jane died after giving birth to a son John in 1850.
