= Joseph Matamata =

Samoan chief and slave trader in New Zealand

Joseph Auga Matamata (born 1953 or 1954) is a New Zealand-based Samoan chief and slave trader. He is the first person in New Zealand to be convicted of using someone as a slave, and the first to be charged with both human trafficking and slavery.

The offences were committed between 1994 and 2019, and involved 13 people. Following a five-week trial at the Napier High Court, Matamata was convicted of 10 counts of trafficking, and 13 counts of slavery. In July 2020 he was sentenced to 11 years in jail, and reparations of NZ$180,000. He also forfeited two properties where the offences occurred. Matamata was granted parole in June 2026 but his release date was delayed after an argument with another prisoner.
