= Putneys Mill, Virginia =

Unincorporated community in Virginia, US

Coordinates: 37°36′20″N 77°05′35″W

Putneys Mill is an unincorporated community in New Kent County, Virginia, United States.
