= Nancy Clarke (entrepreneur) =

Barbadian hotelier and free woman of colour

- Born: Saint Michael, Barbados
- Died: 1811–1812; England
- Other names: Ann Clarke, Nancy Collins
- Occupation: Hotelier
- Spouse: William Clarke
- Children: Georgiana Brown

Nancy Clarke (died 1812) was a Barbadian hotelier and free woman of colour who was known for the continued success of the Royal Naval Hotel. According to Professor Pedro Welch of the University of the West Indies, Clarke's history is indicative of the ingenuity Barbadian women of colour used in the 19th century to secure emancipation from slavery for themselves and others.

== Biography ==
Clarke took over the management of the Royal Naval Hotel in 1791, upon the death of Rachael Pringle Polgreen. The hotel became one of the most popular in Bridgetown, the capital of Barbados, under Clarke's management, though she was known for her temper. A popular song of the time captured her fit of jealousy, which resulted in Clarke throwing acid in the face of another woman. The hotel was frequented by sailors and soldiers and, beyond board and accommodation, it provided women for domestic or sexual services. Rather than serving merely rank and file soldiers, Clarke was known for her fetes which included high-ranking officers, as well as dignitaries, including the Governor of Barbados, Lord Seaforth.

After running the hotel for a decade, Clarke moved to London, leaving the business to Charlotte Barrow (also known as Carolyn Barrow), who operated it until 1821, (Note: Handler's date for the cessation of operation of the Royal Naval Hotel is 1812.) when the business was lost in a fire. After Clarke sold the hotel and moved to London, she lived on Duke Street, St James's. She manumitted a slave named "Scipio" there in 1810.

While it is unknown why she initially moved to England, when she died in 1812, her executors filed paperwork to confirm that her property was not subject to escheat, forfeiture to the state. The attorney general ruled that he had seen her manumission papers and concluded there was no legal reason to seize her property. The bulk of her estate was left to her daughter Georgiana Brown. As per her request, her slave "Satira", was conveyed to James West, a surgeon from Liverpool, who following Clarke's instruction manumitted Satira.

Clarke's biography, along with biographies of other women of colour who were early hoteliers, was presented in Historic Bridgetown by Warren Alleyne. Professor Pedro Welch of the University of the West Indies has also studied Clarke and the ways women slaves and freedmen used their networks and contacts with whites to emancipate other people in bondage in Barbados.
