= Thomas Massie (burgess) =

American politician

Thomas Massie or Massey

Member of the Virginia House of Burgesses representing New Kent County, Virginia
- In office 1723–1727 Serving with John Thornton
- Preceded by: Nicholas Meriwether
- Succeeded by: Richard Richardson Bacon

Personal details
- Born: 1675 Cheshire, England or New Kent, Virginia
- Died: 1731 (aged 55–56) Windsor Forest plantation, New Kent County, Colony of Virginia
- Resting place: New Kent, Virginia
- Spouse: Mary Walker
- Children: William Massie and 10 others
- Parent(s): Peter Massie, Penelope Cooper
- Occupation: planter, military officer, legislator, justice of the peace

Thomas William Massie (born around 1675 or 1677–1732) was a planter, politician, militia officer and vestryman in colonial Virginia. By his death around 1731, he owned 4,000 acres of land in New Kent County, Virginia near the Little Byrd Creek in what is now Goochland County, Virginia as part of his family's Windsor Forest Plantation, which he inherited from his father. In effect, this man established what some considered one of the First Families of Virginia, and later generations of the family often used his first name, but the only man of the same name who achieved political prominence was grandson, Major Thomas Massie, who served with distinction in the American Revolutionary War and established the family on the Tye River (whose confluence with the James River was significantly upstream of this man's property).

== Early and family life ==
This Thomas Massie was born (in either Virginia or Cheshire, England) to Peter Massie (1639/40–1719) and his wife, the former Penelope Cooper. His mother was rumored to be the illegitimate daughter of Anthony Ashley-Cooper, 1st Earl of Shaftesbury. Peter Massey came from the Liverpool/Mersey River area that separates Lancashire and Cheshire, and was probably distantly descended from Hugh of Coddington. He emigrated to the Virginia colony during the tobacco boom of the mid-17th century, possibly in 1680 (a possible elder brother or more distant relative Alexander Massey emigrated to the colony in 1635 and received 400 acres in Accomac County for transporting 8 persons to the new colony). The Massies (spelling not having been standardized in that era and some were educated in Scotland which prefers the "Massey" spelling) were nephews of Edward Massey.

Peter Massie's family included older sons (this man's brothers) John and George Massey (who may have remained in England, or died young, hence this man's inheritance by primogeniture) and younger brother Charles Massey (1686-17XX) whose son Nathaniel Massie would become a surveyor on the frontier as well as the first speaker of the Ohio legislature after the Revolutionary war), as well as sisters Lucretia and Penelope. Peter Massie established the Windsor Forest Plantation located near the Chickahominy river after receiving two land grants totaling 1,155 acres in 1690 and 1700 for paying transportation expenses to the colony for eighteen and six people, respectively. In addition to his farming business, Peter Massey began the family's social rise in the colony by serving as surveyor of the highways in New Kent County from 1708 until his death in 1719.

== Career ==
This Thomas Massie more than doubled the estate he had inherited from his father. He received land grants on November 13, 1721, November 2, 1726 and October 13, 1727 totaling more than 28,000 acres, as well as purchased 400 acres from John Woodson on May 18, 1727.

Massie began his public career in 1704 as a vestryman for his local St. Peter's Parish. Militia service being required of all white men in that era, he rose to the rank of captain in the New Kent County militia. Hanover County having been created from part of New Kent County and veteran legislator John Stanup having died, New Kent County voters elected and re-elected Thomas Massie and John Thornton as their (part-time) representatives in the Virginia House of Burgesses, so he served from 1722 until 1726. Massie also served as Justice of the Peace for New Kent County from 1723 until 1729.

== Personal life and legacy ==
Thomas married Martha Macon in the winter of 1698, and she may have died in childbirth, for he married Mary Walker on March 23, 1699, both in New Kent County. Mary Walker was the great-granddaughter of reverend and lawyer Samuel Thomas Walker, a survivor of the Indian massacre of 1622 at Jamestown. Together Thomas and Mary had eleven children. Their firstborn son William Massie(1718-1749) inherited the Massie's Mill estate, also served in the parish, married twice and later also represented New Kent County in the House of Burgesses. His brother (also) Charles (1727-1817) served in the 5th Virginia Regiment during the Revolutionary War, and established a plantation known as Spring Valley in Albemarle County, Virginia, but his sons John, Charles and Thomas did not hold significant offices.
