= Thomas Massie (planter) =

American planter and military officer

Member of the Virginia House of Delegates for Nelson County
- In office December 3, 1827 – November 30, 1828 Serving with Robert Rives Jr
- Preceded by: Henry B. Martin
- Succeeded by: Joseph C. Megginson
- In office December 1, 1823 – December 3, 1826 Serving with Robert Rives Jr, David Patterson
- Preceded by: Joseph Shelton
- Succeeded by: Henry B. Martin

Personal details
- Born: August 22, 1747 New Kent County, Virginia Colony, British America
- Died: February 2, 1834 (aged 86) "Level Green", Massie estate, Nelson County, Virginia
- Spouse: Sally Cocke
- Children: 3sons
- Parents: William Massie (father); Martha Lucy Bland (mother)
- Relatives: Thomas Massie (grandfather)
- Education: College of William and Mary
- Occupation: politician, planter

Military service
- Branch/service: Virginia militia
- Years of service: 1776–1777
- Rank: Major
- Unit: 6th Virginia Regiment; 2nd Virginia Regiment
- Battles/wars: Battle of Germantown

Thomas Massie (1747–1834) was an American planter, Continental Army military officer and politician from Virginia, possibly best known for his service during the American Revolutionary War, including as an aide-de-camp to General Thomas Nelson at the Siege of Yorktown.

== Early life and education ==
Thomas Massie was born August 22, 1747, in New Kent County, Virginia to William Massie and his wife, Martha Lucy Bland. Both his father and grandfather, Thomas Massie, had represented New Kent County the Virginia House of Burgess, as well as operated the Windsor Forest plantation, increasingly using enslaved labor. Massie attended the College of William and Mary, starting at the age of 13, but withdrew three years later to assist in the maintenance of his family's estate—the Windsor Forest Plantation in New Kent County—following the death of his father in 1751 and mother in 1759.

== Military career ==
When the American Revolution broke out, Massie served with the Elizabeth City District Battalion of Virginia minutemen in September 1775 before entering service with the Continental Army.

In March 1776 Massie was appointed as a captain in the 6th Virginia Regiment of the Continental Army, joining the unit in the defense of Perth Amboy, New Jersey, following the Battle of Long Island. The task of the 6th regiment at Perth Amboy was to ensure the town and surrounding countryside remained impenetrable by British forces who were present in Brooklyn and had already engaged with Continental Army forces on Long Island.

Following the defense of Perth Amboy, the unit was ordered out back toward Newark, from where the regiment attached to the remainder of General Washington's army making their way through New Jersey on the retreat from British forces following the Battle of Long Island. The 6th Virginia fell into the rear of the retreating troops and were appointed to cover the retreat up through Springfield, Scotch Plains, and eventually to New Brunswick along the Raritan River. At the Raritan, the unit came under fire by the British where the Americans, using artillery and small arms fire were able to hold the British off for the entire day, allowing General Washington's army to cross the Delaware on the night of December 24.

The 6th Virginia Regiment would continue onward with then Captain Massie leading elements of men during the Battle of Trenton. Following the action at Trenton, marching under command of General Charles Scott on January 1, 1777, the unit settled near Princeton at Maidenhead, where nearby a van of General Cornwallis's men made an encampment not far off—detached from the 12,000 man strong British main army also located nearby. At dawn, the British attempted to flank the left side of the Americans, however, having deployed two artillery pieces the Americans were able to fire and retreat toward a creek where they destroyed a bridge and join up with other American forces preparing for the Battle of Princeton.

Following action at Princeton and in the Battle of Brandywine, Massie was put under command of Colonel James Hendricks and moved toward duty at Middle Post, Matuchen. Assignment to the post was especially difficult, with constant patrols, frequent skirmishes, and setting up ambushes against the British as frequent tasks.

Sometime after his time with Colonel Hendricks, Massie and five other officers from Virginia were given orders to return to Virginia and await further orders. He returned to join the army under General Washington at White Marsh Hills. That winter, the Continental Army marched from the gulf toward Valley Forge, where Captain Massie was detailed to General Daniel Morgan, who was ordered to take post at Radnor, about halfway between Valley Forge and the mouth of the Schuylkill River.

In February 1778, Massie was promoted to major and transferred to the 11th Virginia Regiment, where he commanded troop elements in the Battle of Monmouth. Massie was again transferred in September 1778 to the 2d Virginia Regiment and returned to the Virginia colony in 1779 when the unit was ordered back south. In June 1779, following years of service in combat throughout the war, Massie began a bout with rheumatism, experiencing debilitating joint pain that took him off of the front. He resigned his commission after correspondence with General George Washington, who was in Philadelphia at the time, writing:

"From a late rhuematick illness, I have been detained in Virginia, and still find myself incapable of Military Service, therefore request your Excellency's permission to retire from the Army—I have had no Commission since the arrangement of the Virginia Line. Otherwise, should have inclosed it, My present indisposition, increased by the fatigue of travelling, prevents my waiting on Your Excellency, in Person."

General Washington replied, accepting his resignation on June 25, 1779:

"I have received Your Letter of the 11th Instant—and I am extremely sorry to hear, that you have been so much afflicted with the Rheumatism.1 Your situation will not permit me to refuse your request to retire from the service; and I have only to regret the circumstance, which deprives the States of an Officer of your merit."

Separating at the rank of major, Massie served as an aide-de-camp to General Nelson beginning in the winter of 1780. Massie would continue in that capacity until 1781, where serving in capacity as an aide to the general, he was present at the Siege of Yorktown and at the surrender of General Cornwallis.

== Personal life ==
After the war, Thomas Massie married Sarah "Sally" Cocke (1760–1838) in 1781. Sarah had been born at her family's Bremo plantation in Henrico County. Descended from the First Families of Virginia through her great-grandfather Richard Cocke, an early Virginia planter, her first-cousin once removed was brigadier general John Hartwell Cocke. Sarah and Thomas had three sons together: Thomas Jr. born 1782, Henry born 1784, and William born 1795. Thomas Jr. was educated as a doctor, and William married three times, naming his only son (who never married) Thomas.

== Planter ==
In the 1780s, Thomas and Sarah moved the family from Millwood in then Frederick County (now Clarke). By 1803 he settled on 3,111 acres on the Upper Tye River (a tributary of the James River) in what became Nelson County in 1807, which was earlier part of Amherst County. In between, for his military service Massie received land grants. In 1783 he obtained 2,333 acres. These lands were in the Scioto Valley in Ohio near what is the current city of Chillicothe, Ohio, as well as Kentucky, and near Covington, Virginia. As administrator of his step-father-in-law's estate, Massie traveled to Nelson County to settle the estate before deciding to stay and purchased an addition 9,000 acres and built his plantation home called "Level Green."

Around 1814, using slave labor, he ordered the construction of Pharsalia, the plantation home built on the Massie estate in Nelson County as a wedding gift to his son William along with 1,400 acres of land. Thomas also gifted his son William his first twenty-one slaves for the property as part of the wedding present.

== Politician ==
Upon Nelson County's creation from Amherst County in 1807, Massie became one of the new county's first magistrates. Nelson County voters thrice elected Massie as one of their representatives in the Virginia House of Delegates. He also was elected to the Virginia Constitutional Convention of 1829-1830.

== Death and legacy ==
Massie continued to live at Level Green on the Massie estate until his death in 1834 at the age of 86.
