= Rachael Pringle Polgreen =

Barbadian hotelier and brothel keeper

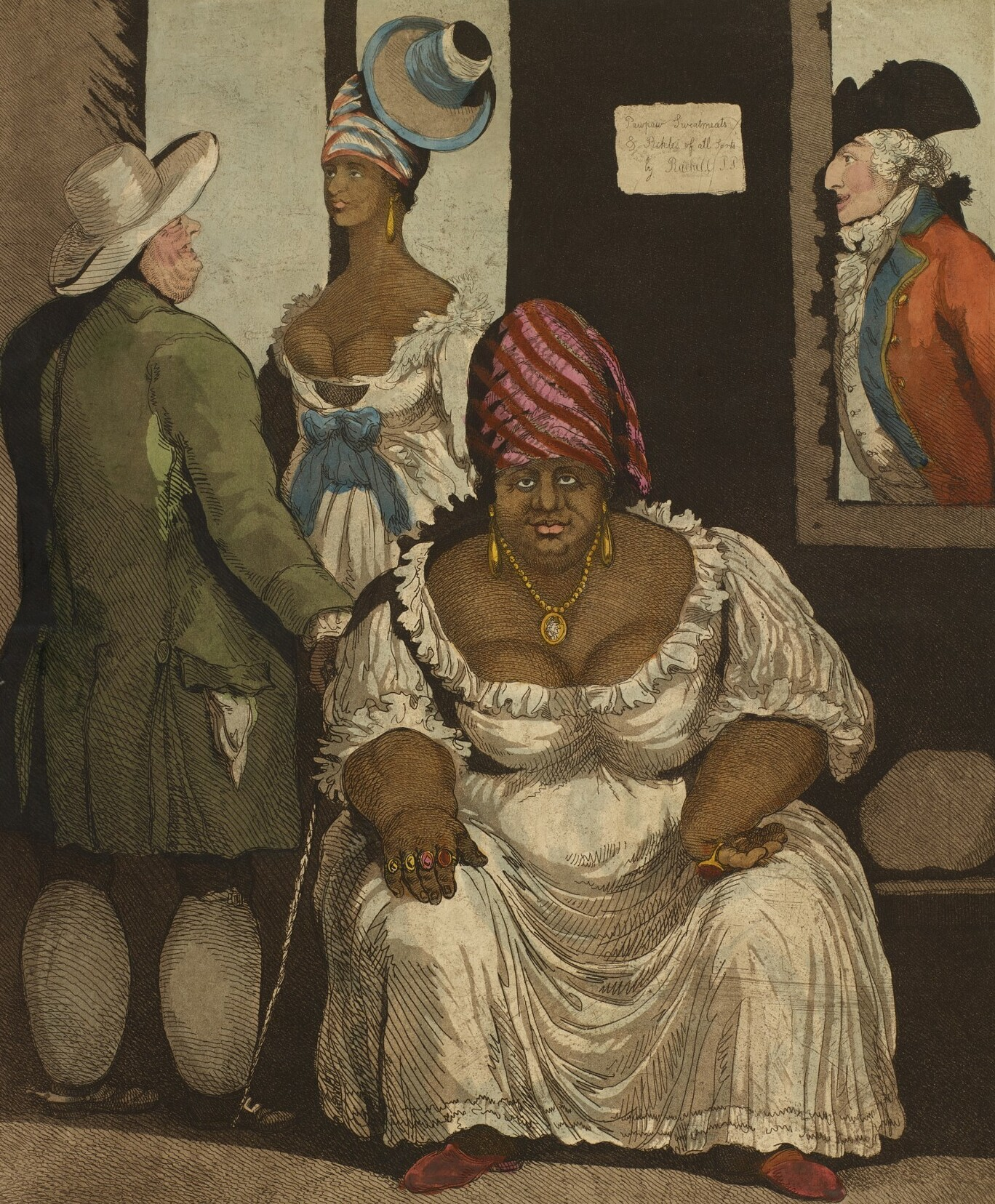
- Polgreen (second from right) in a 1796 Thomas Rowlandson lithograph
- Born: Rachael Lauder c. 1753; Bridge Town, Barbados
- Died: 1791 (aged 37–38); Bridge Town, Barbados
- Occupations: hotelier; brothel keeper
- Father: William Lauder

Rachael Pringle Polgreen (born Rachael Lauder; c. 1753 – 1791) was a Barbadian hotelier and brothel keeper. Born into slavery, her freedom was purchased, and she became the owner of the Royal Naval Hotel, a brothel that catered to the itinerant military personnel on the island of Barbados.

She was one of the first mulatto women to operate a business in the colony. Rising to prominence, her story has been told and retold in Bajan history, with the narrative being shaped by different eras. At times, her biography was used as a cautionary tale, while in other eras, it was used to illustrate empowerment. Recent scholarship has focused on archival records in an attempt to provide a clearer picture of African and African-descended women's lives during the slave economy.

== Early life ==
Polgreen was born Rachael Lauder in c. 1753 in Bridge Town, Barbados to an enslaved woman and William Lauder, a Scottish schoolmaster. J. W. Orderson wrote a novel, Creoleana in 1855, which details her life. Orderson, who inherited the newspaper, Barbados Mercury, from his father John Orderson, would have been a teenager during Polgreen's life; it is probable from the evidence of advertisements placed in his paper by Polgreen that the two knew each other.

Other than archival records, an etching, and Orderson's stereotyped and sexualized retelling of her life with its intent to make a moral statement against miscegenation, little is known from her perspective of her life. In Orderson's narrative, she was purchased by Captain Thomas Pringle of the Royal Navy to rescue her from her sexually abusive father. Pringle and Lauder had become lovers and after he purchased her, he manumitted her and set her up in a house in Bridgetown.

== Career ==
After settling Lauder in the house, Pringle left the island, returning to his military career. Lauder took his name and later took the surname Polgreen, though it is unclear whether that was due to another relationship. She turned the house Pringle purchased for her into a hotel, which also served as a brothel, offering sexual services to the itinerant military personnel traveling through Bridgetown.

After an incident in which Prince William Henry visited her hotel, wrecking it in a drunken spree, and threw Polgreen from her chair into the street, Orderson tells that she sent the prince (later King William IV) a hefty bill for damages. She named the establishment the Royal Naval Hotel, referencing the prince and the navy as her prestigious clients. Whether the story of the encounter is legend or not is unknown; however, an advertisement in the Barbados Gazette in 1789 offered a reward from Polgreen for the return of several items. The publication dates coincide with the prince's visit to the island and might indicate that there is some truth to the novel's depiction of events.

Archival records from the Privy Council minutes of 1791 paint a portrait of Polgreen as having a violent temper and abusing the people she enslaved. The Barbados Slave Code allowed enslavers to punish people they enslaved with extreme violence, nor was her running of a brothel controversial. Marisa J. Fuentes, a scholar who studies enslaved women of the Caribbean, has evaluated how formerly enslaved women became dependent upon the slave economy and thus perpetuated the system of exploitation of others. For example, in 1780, Polgreen sold a woman named Joanna to a soldier, Joseph Haycock, who manumitted her. Unable to support herself as a free woman, three years later, Joanna indentured herself to Polgreen for twelve years in exchange for clothing, food, and drink. Likewise, though Polgreen was able to amass property and gain an economic position similar to many white business people, she was only able to do that in an endeavor that would not have been considered respectable for her white counterparts.

Polgreen accrued an estate worth over £2,900, which included houses, goods, furnishings, and thirty-eight enslaved people. Comparable to an estate of a moderately well-to-do white person at the time, her wealth bound her to an affluent social network, allowing her burial in the Anglican cemetery. Per the terms of her will, she manumitted an enslaved person named Joanna and transferred ownership of two of the other people she enslaved to Joanna. She also freed an enslaved person named Princess and four mulatto children. The rest of the people she enslaved were bequeathed to "William Firebrace and his female relatives, William Stevens, and Captain Thomas Pringle". It is unclear from the will whether the freedom of Joanna discounted her earlier manumission or whether it terminated her contract of indenture.

Thomas Rowlandson, an English artist, printed an etching of Polgreen in 1796. The caricature depicts Polgreen sitting in front of her establishment, which is adorned with a sign proclaiming "Pawpaw Sweetmeats & Pickles of all Sorts by Rachel PP". Behind her and to her left in the work is a young woman, clad in a low-cut dress, facing a portly white man wearing tattered garments. To her right is a white British military officer peering from a window. In 1958, the Journal of the Barbados Museum and Historical Society contained an anonymously written article analyzing the painting. The author claimed that the painting was an allegorical reference to Polgreen's life, with the woman in the background representing Polgreen as a young woman, the tattered man depicting her master-father-abuser, and the officer illustrating her savior Pringle. Fuentes noted that figures and the sign allude to sexuality, as is typical for works by Rowlandson. The double entendre of the words both indicate that Polgreen was involved in the market economy, but also refer to the consumption of women's bodies (delectable fruit) by men (phallic symbolism).

== Death and legacy ==
Polgreen was buried in the Cathedral Church of Saint Michael and All Angels churchyard in Bridgetown on 23 July 1791. Her hotel was taken over by Nancy Clarke, who ran it successfully for a decade, before turning it over to Carolyn Barrow (also sometimes Charlotte Barrow). It continued in business until it was destroyed in a fire in 1821.

Her legacy has been used repeatedly in Bajan historiography to represent different images at different times. In the nineteenth century, her story was exploited as a cautionary tale about the dangers of not curtailing the sexuality of black women. In the post-colonial period, Polgreen's story was used by elites to foster a sense of the benefits to be gained by accommodation and loyalty to Britain. Still later, she began to symbolize the power that black women could wield in resistance to slavery.

Current scholarship is reevaluating her story once again to ascertain how the complexities of her life, such as her sexual abuse and then sexual exploitation of others, living under the threat of punishment and then domination of others, interacted, keeping in mind that the discourse is colored by the facts that she was an illiterate woman of color and did not tell her own story.
