= João de Deus Pires Ferreira =

Brazilian revolutionary

- Born: 1759; São Frei Pedro Gonçalves, Recife
- Died: 1821 (aged 61–62)
- Occupation: Administrator of the stowage of Pernambuco Customs
- Spouse: Angélica Joaquina Rosa
- Children: 1
- Parents: Domingos Pires Ferreira (father); Joana Maria de Deus Correia Pinto (mother)
- Family: Pires Ferreira

João de Deus Pires Ferreira (1759–1821) was a Brazilian militant for the end of the slavery and the rule of Dom João VI over Brazil. He was part of the Pernambucan revolt, but was arrested and died shortly after his release.

== Biography ==
João de Deus Pires Ferreira was born in 1759, on the freguesia of São Frei Pedro Gonçalves, Recife. Son of Domingos Pires Ferreira with Joanna Maria de Deus Correia Pinto, he had 14 siblings, being the 8th oldest.

He studied philosophy (1776) and mathematics (1778, 1781) at the University of Coimbra, and graduated as Bachelor of Laws on 21 May 1778. During his studies, he became personal friends with the poet Sousa Caldas. Sousa wrote him a letter called "Carta Marítima" (1790), that differed from the rest of his work by the use of satire and irreverence and making it clear their sympathy to the French Revolution. There, he also became known to Joaquim Pinto de Campos.

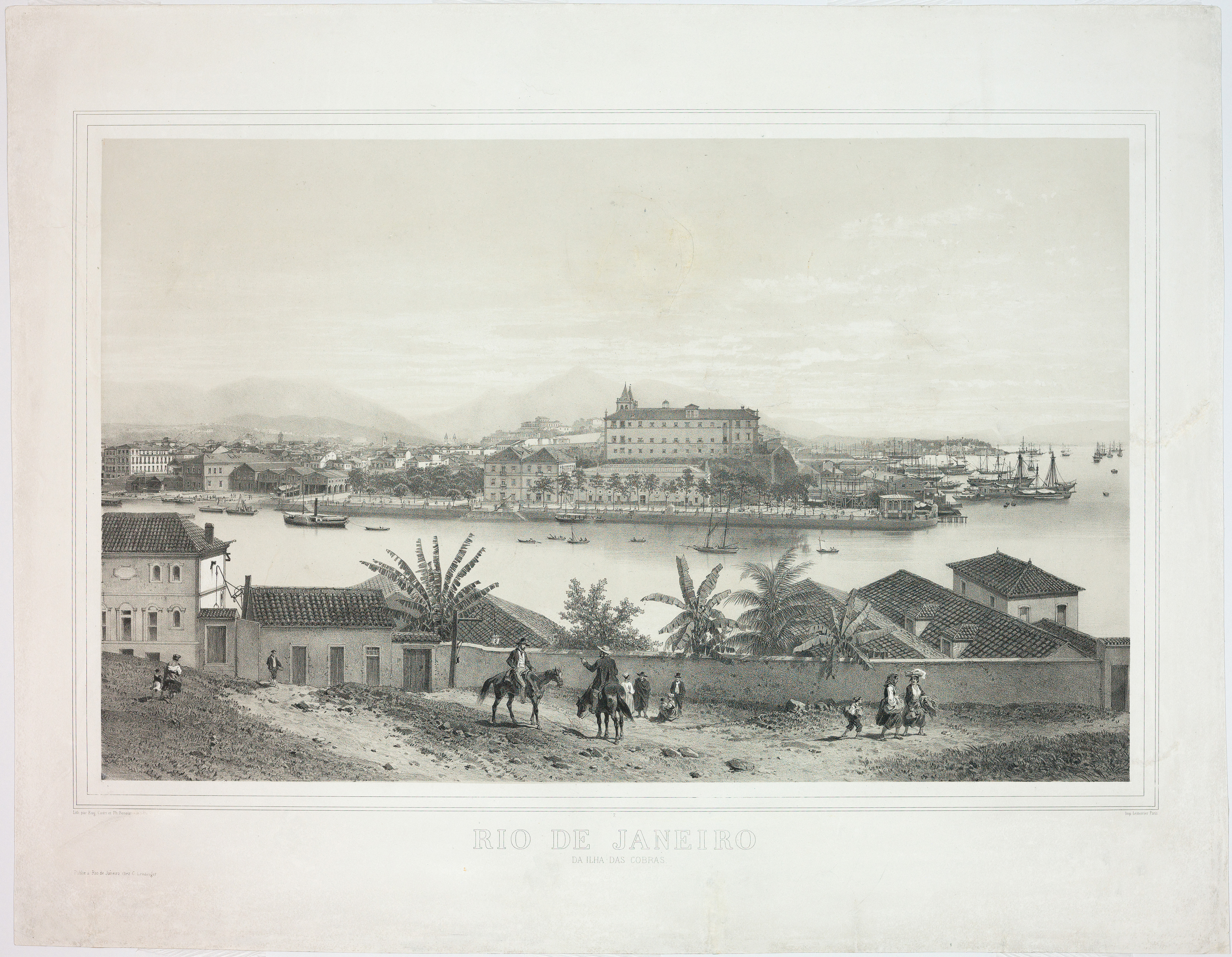
João de Deus spent three years on Snake Island for his participation on the Prenambucan revolt

Back in Brazil, João de Deus became administrator of the stowage of Pernambuco Customs. Since 1786, he and Bernardo Luiz Ferreira Portugal, another friend from the University of Coimbra, militated against the reign of Dom João VI and supported the abolition of slavery. He and his relatives Gervásio, Domingos and Joaquim Pires Ferreira took part in the Pernambucan revolt in 1817. He was arrested and spent three years in the Snake Island, Rio de Janeiro, and later sent to a prison in Bahia. He was freed on 10 December 1820, but died on April 1821 due sickness.

== Personal life ==
João de Deus married Angélica Joaquina Rosa and had one daughter, Joaquina Angélica.
