= Domingos Pires Ferreira =

Domingos Pires Ferreira may refer to

- Domingos Pires Ferreira (merchant), a Portuguese merchant, born 1718
- Domingos Pires Ferreira (priest), a Brazilian priest, born 1753
