= Domingos Malaquias de Aguiar Pires Ferreira, 1st Baron of Cimbres =

Domingos Malaquias de Aguiar Pires Ferreira 1st Baron of Cimbres

Incumbent President of the Province of Pernambuco
- In office 17 June 1848 – 15 July 1848
- Monarch: Pedro II of Brazil
- Preceded by: Vicente Pires da Mota
- Succeeded by: Antônio da Costa Pinto

39th Vice-President of the Province of Pernambuco
- In office 1842–1848
- President: Vicente Pires da Mota

Congressman of the Province of Pernambuco
- In office 1826–1829
- President: José Carlos da Silva Mayrink Ferrão; Francisco de Paula Cavalcanti de Albuquerque; Tomás Xavier Garcia de Almeida

Congressman of the General and Extraordinary Cortes of the Portuguese Nation
- In office 1820–1822
- Monarch: John VI of Portugal

Personal details
- Born: November 3, 1788 Recife
- Died: December 10, 1859 (aged 71) Recife
- Spouse: Joaquina Angélica Pires Ferreira (m. 1820)
- Children: 3
- Parents: José Estevão de Aguiar (father); Maria do Sacramento Pires Ferreira (mother)
- Occupation: Businessman
- Family: Pires Ferreira

Domingos Malaquias de Aguiar Pires Ferreira, 1st Baron of Cimbres (1788–1859) was a Brazilian businessman, revolutionary and politician. He was part of the Pernambucan revolution, serving as a translator for the ambassador of the Provisional Government of the Republic in the United States. Later, he partook on several political roles during the United Kingdom of Portugal, Brazil and the Algarves and the Empire of Brazil.

== Early life ==
Domingos Malaquias was born in Recife, 3 November 1788, son of José Estevão de Aguiar and Maria do Sacramento Pires Ferreira. He had two siblings, being the oldest.

Domingos has studied humanities at the Seminar of Olinda. On 1 October 1807, he enrolled at the University of Coimbra to study mathematics, but his studies were disrupted by the Invasion of Portugal during the Napoleonic Wars. He has also studied in England.

== Pernambucan Revolution ==
Back in Brazil, Domingos has worked as a farmer in Engenho Macaú. In 1816, he became a Stevedoring Administrator at the Pernambuco Customs.

On 6 April 1817, Domingos and Antonio Gonçalves da Cruz were sent to the United States to gather support for the Pernambucan revolution. There, he served as a secretary and translator. They arrived in Boston on 15 May, during the Presidency of James Madison, and merchants sent ships with provisions and ammunition to the revolutionaries.

After the failure of the revolution, he had lived in the United States for a while and then moved to Paris, where he has graduated in Natural Sciences.

== Career as politician ==
Domingos had returned to the Captaincy of Pernambuco, but after the Beberibe Convention, he was named congressman for the Constituent Cortes of 1820 and moved to Lisbon. In 1821, he was indicated as President of the Province of Alagoas, but he refused the role. In 1824, he worked as Inspector of the Pernambuco Customs. He served as congressman in the first legislature of the Province of Pernambuco from 1826 to 1829. He had moved to the Province of Rio de Janeiro and was named Director of Troco do Papel Moeda. From 1842 to 1848, he served as vice-president of the province of Pernambuco. He briefly served as president from 17 June to 15 July 1848.

== Career as businessman ==
Domingos also became a successful businessman through his investments in engenhos. He also had ten shares on the Recife and San Francisco Railway Company.

In 1830, Domingos was robbed by a group of quilombolas.

Domingos died in Recife, 10 December 1859, and left an inheritance consisted of several houses, slaves, gold and interest of the engenho Algodoais.

== Personal life ==
Domingos married on 3 July 1820 with his cousin Joaquina Angélica Pires Ferreira. He had three children, Maria do Sacramento de Aguiar Pires Ferreira, João de Deus Aguiar Pires Ferreira and João de Deus Aguiar Pires Ferreira.

== Homages ==
Domingos was named Comendator of the Order of Christ in 1829 and Officer of the Imperial Order of the Rose in 1849.

On 21 October 1853, Dom Pedro II gave him the title of Baron of Cimbres.

The Conselheiro Aguiar Avenue, on Bela Vista, Recife, was named in his homage.
