= Barras, Piauí =

Coordinates: 4.24694°S 42.2958°W

Barras
- Municipality
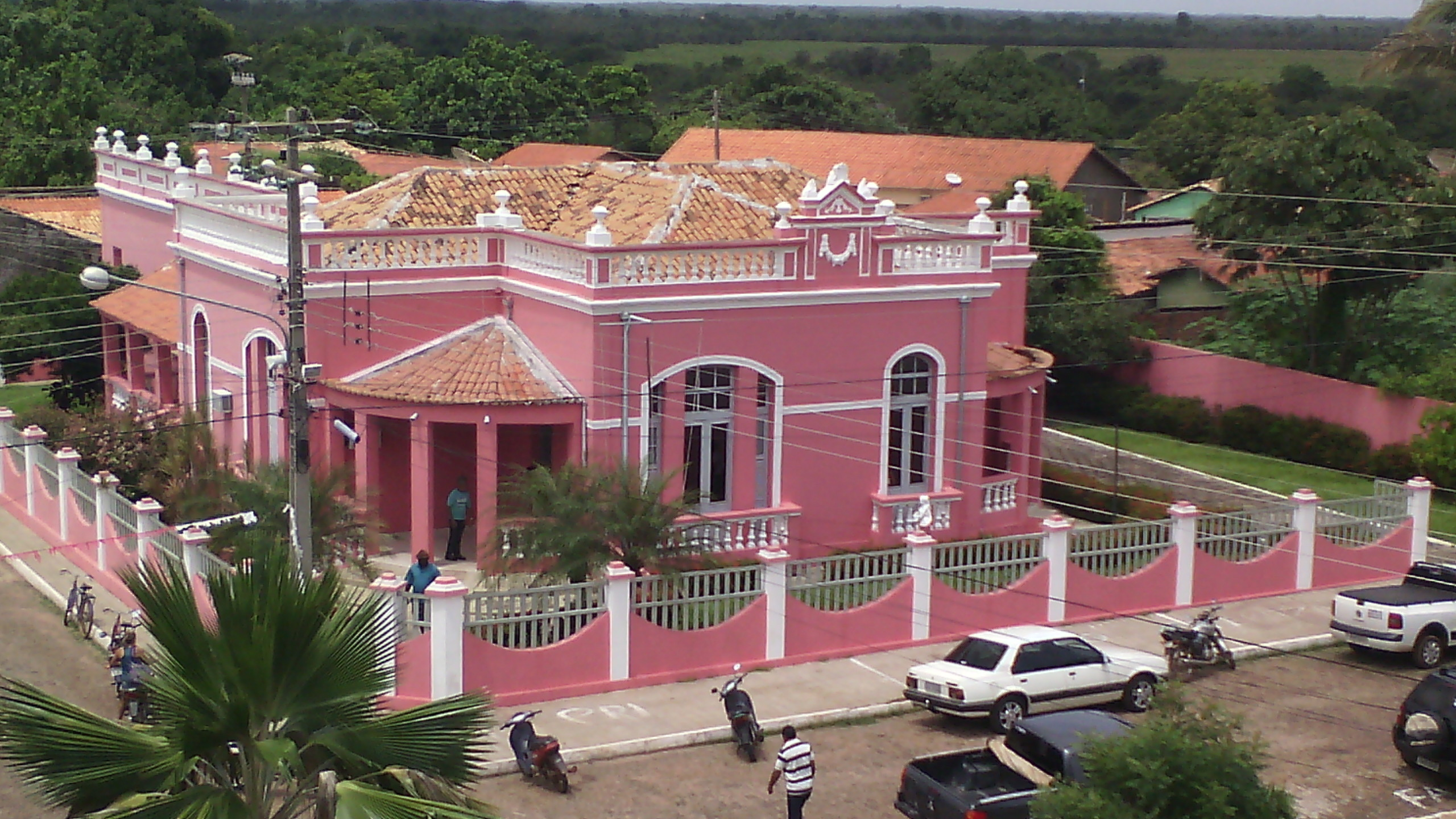

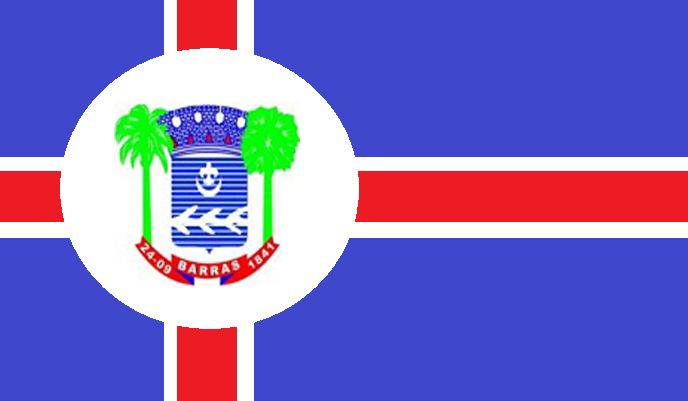
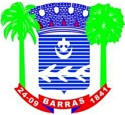
- Flag Coat of arms

- Country: Brazil
- Region: Nordeste
- State: Piauí
- Mesoregion: Norte Piauiense

Population (2020)
  - Total: 47,185
- Time zone: UTC−3 (BRT)

Barras is a municipality in the state of Piauí in the Northeast region of Brazil.

== See also ==
- List of municipalities in Piauí
