= Cortes (politics) =

Political body of clergy, nobility and the people

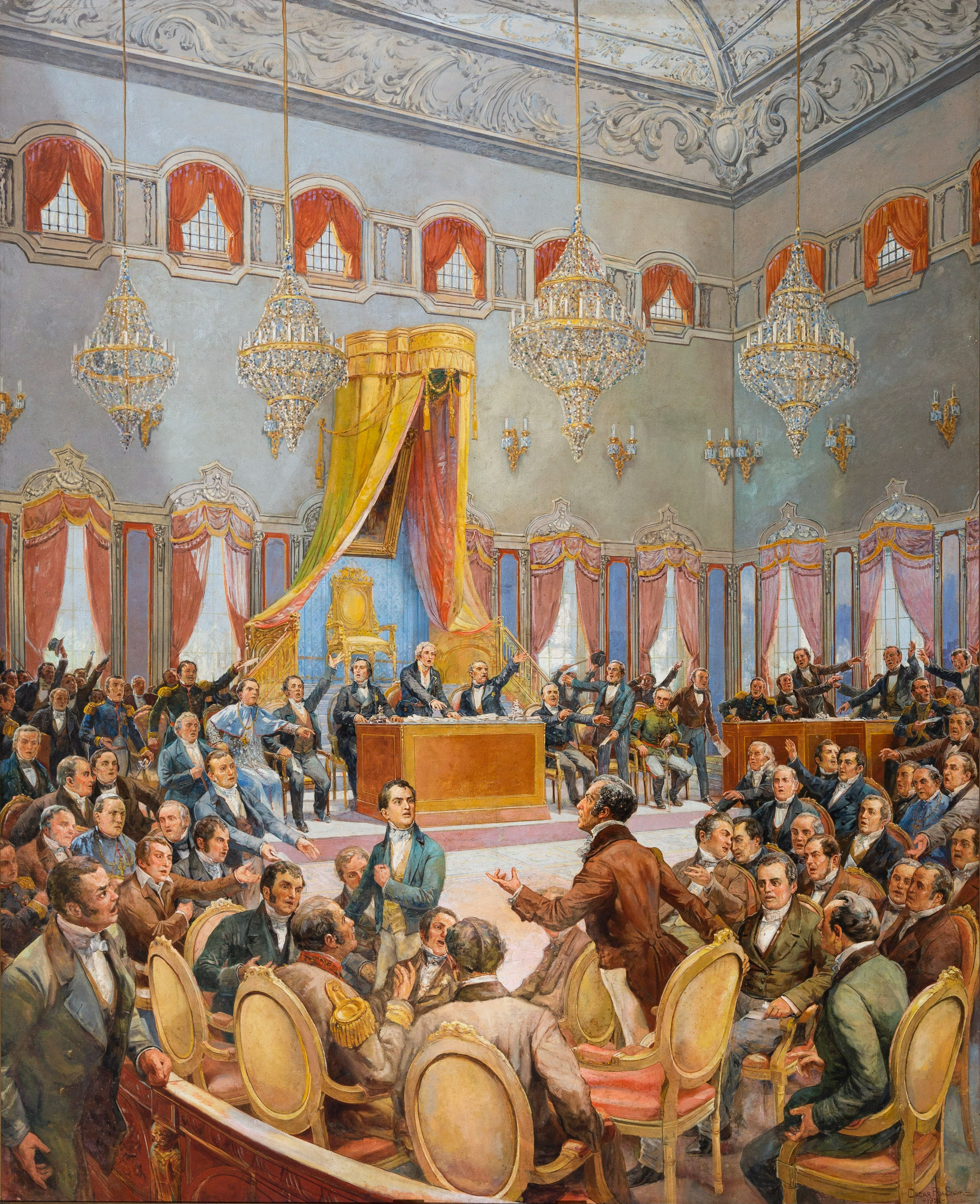
The General and Extraordinary Cortes of the Portuguese Nation, in a 1920s painting by Oscar Pereira da Silva

Cortes (from the Latin term cohors) were political bodies of a parliamentary, consultative and deliberative character in traditional monarchies, or on their behalf; and the different social classes established in three Orders: the First Estate, which corresponded to the branch of the clergy; the Second Estate, which was the branch of the nobility; and the Third Estate, which was the branch of the people.

The designation Cortes comes from the name of the court given to each of the various audiences through which the work of the assembly was carried out. However, there are different designations for them: curia, synod, and parliament. According to Armindo de Sousa, there were as many as sixteen of these designations.

The Cortes never followed a set periodicity, depending on the socio-political conjuncture and the monarch's will, functioning by his summons.

== Cortes in Portugal ==
The Cortes have their origins in the old Curia Régia, a purely consultative body that advised the monarchy on the resolution of various issues, still in the time of the County of Portugal, and the first documented Curia for the Kingdom of Portugal met in Coimbra in 1211, in the early months of the reign of King Afonso II. As for their antecedents, they were found in the national councils of the Visigoth monarchy.

=== Composition and operation ===
The Cortes of Portugal were composed of the clergy (diocesan prelates, representatives of the chapters, and superiors of religious orders), the nobility, and the people (who were represented by the procurators of the councils and other illustrious persons). The councils that were entitled to participate were about a hundred: In the Cortes of Lisbon of 1502, there were 127 councils, and in the Cortes of Lisbon of 1641, a total of 104.

They functioned by summons from the king in ordinary sessions, preceded by solemn sessions. In the solemn session, an opening speech, presenting the reasons for the convocation, was given by someone appointed by the king.

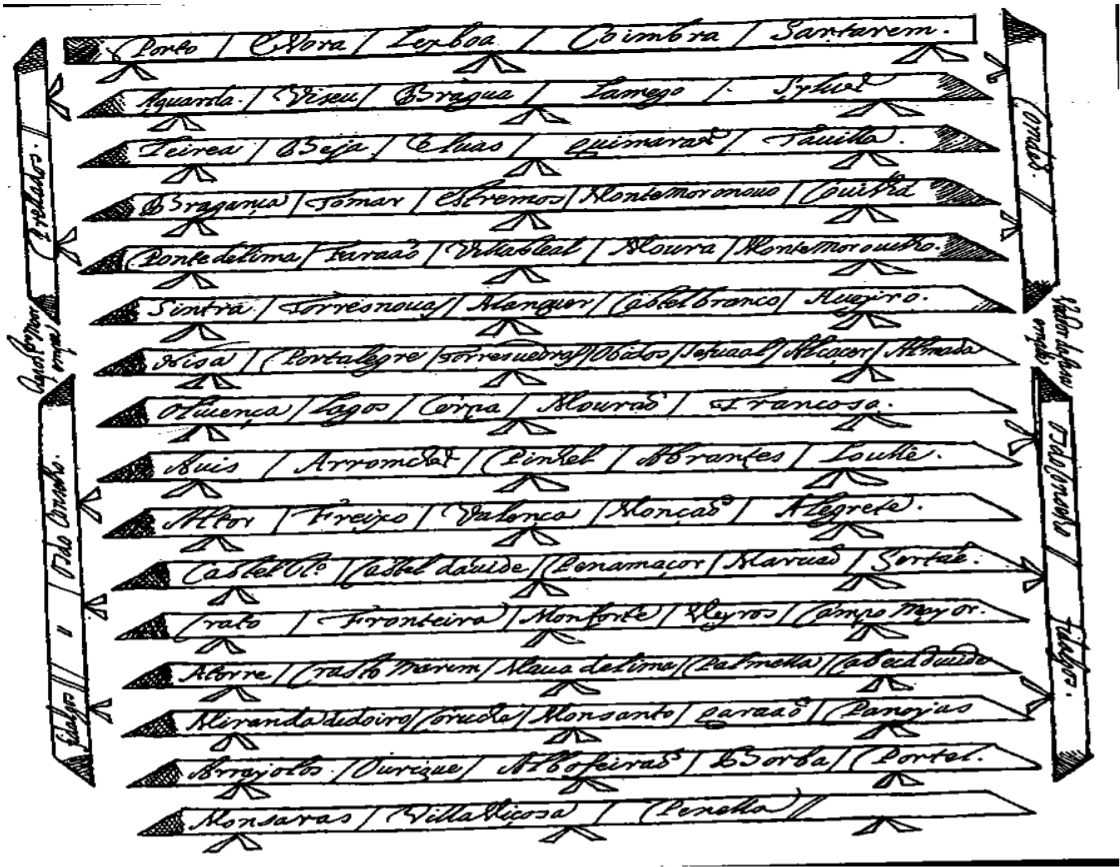
The seats assigned to the representatives of the cities, nobility and clergy at the Cortes of Évora (1481-82)

The work of the courts took place in separate meetings of each of the three branches, in which each presented their petitions or conclusions to the king. The king would then reply to all of them, and in the event of an impasse or not, the final decision would rest with him. The proceedings lasted indefinitely until the matters to be discussed were finished, but they lasted an average of one month.

They were often called "Cortes Gerais" (in archaic spelling, Côrtes Geraes) especially when held to elect and acclaim. But formally, the courts were limited to formulating requests to the king, on matters of general interest of the kingdom or interest to a particular locality or socio-professional group. If the king granted such a request, it was understood that such assumed the value of the law.

Because of its consultative nature, the vassals were encouraged to present their problems, and the monarch acted on the vassals' requests, which were formulated in two main types of documents:

- The particular chapters: which contained the particular problems of each county;
- The general chapters: produced by the three Estates in the initial phase of each assembly, and included issues of more general scope, from corporate claims to warnings about current affairs in the kingdom.

Initially, the participation in the Cúria was an act of vassalage and not a prerogative, but progressively these assemblies evolved to a model less palatial and increasingly based on the approach to political, economic, and legislative problems. The Cortes only became effective from the moment in which the "branch of the people" began to have a permanent seat in them, through the representatives of the counties, in addition to the nobility and the clergy, who had previously been closer to the king.

From very early on, the custom was established that tax matters were decided with the agreement of the Cortes; thus the Cortes began by asserting their competence in matters of breakage or supplemental tax compensation, later extending, also by custom, the sphere of the need for their agreement to the creation of new taxes and loan authorizations, as well as the resolution of situations of absence of a legitimate heir to the Crown or the decision to assign the regency to one of several legitimate pretenders to the throne, recognition, and acclamation of the sovereign or heir.

The golden period of the Cortes in Portugal, in larger numbers, corresponds to the 14th and 15th centuries. The first one was held in Leiria in 1254. Their decadence began with the evolution of the ideas of the legists, which were making the monarch less dependent on the great noble lords, and with the overseas economic expansion that freed them from the extraordinary taxes demanded from everyone.

=== The Cortes of Portugal in the Modern Age ===
Portuguese monarchs, exploiting the riches of the Portuguese empire abroad, became less dependent on the subsidies of Cortes and convened them less frequently. João II (r.1481-1495) used them to break the high nobility, but dismissed them otherwise. Manuel I (r.1495-1521) called them only four times in his long reign. By the time of King Sebastião (r.1554-1578), the Cortes were virtually irrelevant.

== Cortes in France and the French Revolution ==
Also called the Assembly of Estates General in the context of Old Regime France, they were one of the driving forces behind the French Revolution of 1789.

Faced with the severity and proportions of the French economic crisis, Jacques Necker, Finance Minister under Louis XVI, proposed to levy taxes on the clergy and nobility, causing the so-called Aristocratic Revolt (1787-1789). Under pressure, the sovereign summoned the Estates General, that had not met since 1314, when Philip IV reigned.

The assembly of the Estates General met in May 1789 at the Palace of Versailles, with the unstated aim of getting the Third Estate to bear the taxes that the clergy and nobility refused to pay. These two Estates tried various maneuvers to contain the reformist impetus of the Third Estate, whose representatives intended to put forward the complaints of the people (Cahiers de Doleances). Given the intransigence of the dominant Estates, the representatives of the Third Estate met separately on June 15, 1789, precipitating the revolution.
