= Constituent Cortes of 1820 =

Portugal's first modern parliament

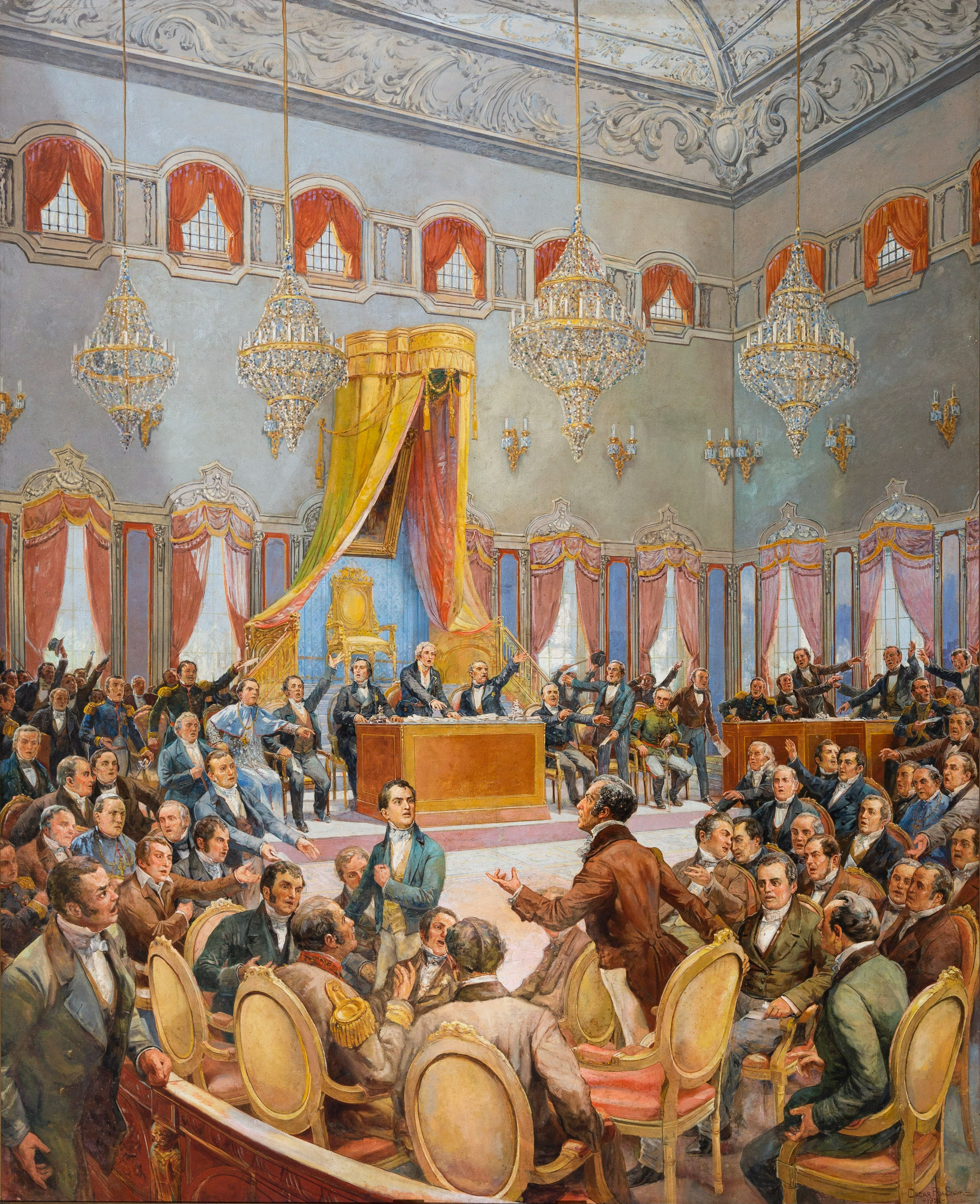
The Portuguese Cortes in 1822, by Oscar Pereira da Silva

The Constituent Cortes of 1820, officially the General and Extraordinary Cortes of the Portuguese Nation, also frequently known as the Sovereign Congress or the Cortes Constituintes Vintistas, was the first modern Portuguese parliament. Created after the Liberal Revolution of 1820 to prepare a constitution for Portugal and its overseas territories, it used a different system from the traditional General Cortes for choosing representatives, and the three traditional feudal estates (Clergy, Nobility, and Commoners) no longer sat separately. The Cortes sat between January 24, 1821 and November 4, 1822 at the Necessidades Palace in Lisbon. The work of the Constitutional Cortes culminated in the approval of the Portuguese Constitution of 1822.

== Elections ==
The government installed after the Oporto Revolution, known as the Provisional Junta of the Supreme Government of the Kingdom, decided to convene the Cortes and on September 1, 1820 set up a preparatory commission. On November 22, the Commission published instructions for the election of representatives to the Cortes, which were held in December 1820. The original instructions only provided for representatives from Portugal, ignoring Brazil and provoking great discontent. The instructions were then revised and re-issued in November, establishing the proportional representation that included in the overseas domains and abandoning the traditional division into three orders.

The electoral method chosen by the Commission was closely modelled on the electoral system Spain under the Spanish Constitution of 1812. It involved a complex process of indirect suffrage through the formation of parish, county, and provincial electoral committees. Male citizens over the age of 25 (in some cases over 21 years of age) with a job, a trade or useful occupation, elected an electoral college who, in turn, chose county voters. These then met in the provincial capitals and elected the representatives to the Cortes, with one representative for every 30,000 inhabitants. Representatives were required to be at least 25 years of age. Despite the complexity of the process and inexperience of those operating it, the election was completed on Christmas Day 1820, with deputies elected in most provinces of Portugal. The remainder were elected in the following months.

These electoral criteria had the effect, in Brazil, of transforming the traditional captaincies into provinces. The first Brazilian province to declare its adherence to the Cortes was Pará on 1 January 1821, followed on February 10 by Bahia, Piauí, Maranhão and Pernambuco. Other parts of Brazil followed in due course. Representatives from Sao Paulo, Paraíba, Pará, Espírito Santo, Goiás and Ceará only joined the Cortes in 1822. Representatives from Minas Gerais, Rio Grande do Norte, Cisplatina and Rio Grande do Sul did not take their seats in the Cortes, remaining in Brazil in demonstration of support to the regent Dom Pedro. in total 97 representatives and alternates were elected from Brazil.

== Drafting a constitution ==
On 9 March, less than three months after its opening meeting, the Cortes approved the "Bases of the Constitution", a document later sworn to by King John VI of Portugal on July 4 immediately after his return from exile in Brazil. Based on this document the Cortes then drafted and approved the first Portuguese Constitution, which was approved on September 30, 1822. The Cortes met for the last time on November 4, 1822. Although the constitution of 1822 only remained in effect for a short time, it served as an inspiration for Portuguese liberalism, and even influenced the first republican constitution of Portugal, approved almost a century later. On November 4, 1822, the work of the General and Extraordinary Cortes of the Portuguese Nation ended, and it became an ordinary assembly on November 15, 1822.

== Divergence between Portugal and Brazil ==
In August 1821 the Cortes discussing a series of administrative measures to reorganize institutional power. Among other reforms the Cortes suppressed Brazil’s existing provincial governments and courts, and demanded the immediate return of the Prince Regent Dom Pedro to Lisbon. These discussions began before the Brazilian representatives arrived on August 29 and marked the beginning of a policy of confrontation between Lisbon and the regency of Dom Pedro. In addition trade relations between Brazil and Portugal became a point of divergence between deputies of the two kingdoms. To reconcile the different positions, in March 1822, a special commission of six Brazilian and six Portuguese representatives was established.

The Brazilian representatives wanted to continue the pre-revolutionary system of a dual monarchy, with Portugal and Brazil as federated elements within a single empire, while the Portuguese representatives wanted a unitary state. The polarization between the two increased tension in the provinces, especially from January 1822 when Dom Pedro decided to stay in Brazil. On 4 May a decree of Dom Pedro established that no decision of the Cortes could be applied in Brazil without his assent. On September 23 and 24, the Political Constitution of the Portuguese Monarchy was signed by 39 of the 46 Brazilian deputies in office.

== Representatives from Portugal in the Cortes ==
The following representatives took part in the debates:

=== Kingdom of the Algarve ===
- Manoel José Placido da Sylva Negrão.
- José Vaz Velho.
- Jeronymo José Carneiro.

=== Minho Province ===
- Francisco Wanzeller
- Antonio Pereira
- José Maria Xavier de Araujo
- Francisco Xavier Calheiros
- João de Sousa Pinto de Magalhães
- José Ferreira Borges
- Rodrigo Ribeiro Telles da Sylva
- João Baptista Felgueiras
- Basilio Alberto de Sousa
- Archbishop da Bahia
- João Pereira da Sylva
- José Joaquim Rodrigues de Bastos
- Joaquim José dos Santos Pinheira
- Antonio Ribeiro da Costa
- Manoel Martins Couto

=== Trás-os-Montes Province ===
- Bernardo Corrêa de Castro e Sepulveda
- Manoel Gonçalves de Miranda
- Antonio Lobo de Barbosa Teixeira Ferreira Girão

=== Beira Province ===
- José Maria de Sousa e Almeida
- José de Gouvêa Osorio
- Antonio Pinheiro d'Azevedo e Sylva
- Baron de Molellos
- José Pedro da Costa Ribeiro Teixeira
- José de Mello de Castro e Abreu
- Bishop de Lamego
- João de Figueiredo
- José Joaquim de Faria
- José Ribeiro Saraiva
- Antonio José Ferreira de Sousa
- Pedro José Lopes d'Almeida
- Manoel Fernandes Thomaz
- José Joaquim Ferreira de Moura
- Antonio Maria Osorio Cabral
- Thomé Rodrigues Sobral
- Manoel de Serpa Machado

=== Alentejo Province ===
- Carlos Honorio de Gouvêa Durão
- João Vicente da Sylva
- Joaquim Annes de Carvalho
- João Rodrigues de Brito
- José Victorino Barreto Feyo
- Ignacio da Costa Brandão
- José Antonio da Rosa

=== Estremadura Province ===
- Bento Pereira do Carmo
- Francisco de Lemos Bittencourt
- Agostinho José Freire
- Luiz Antonio Rebello da Sylva
- Alvaro Xavier da Fonseca Coutinho e Povoas
- Luiz Monteiro
- João Alexandrino de Sousa Queiroga
- Felix Avelar Brotero
- Hermano José Braancamp do Sobral
- Francisco Antonio dos Santos
- Henrique Xavier Baeta
- José Ferrão de Mendonça e Sousa
- João Maria Soares Castello Branco
- Francisco de Paula Travassos
- Manoel Agostinho Madeira Torres
- Manoel Antonio de Carvalho
- Francisco Xavier Monteiro
- Manoel Borges Carneiro
- José Carlos Coelho Carneiro Pacheco

== Representatives from Brazil in the Cortes ==
(Based on the "Lista Nominal dos Deputados do Brasil à Assembleia Constituinte de Lisboa de 1821 a 1823").

=== Alagoas Province ===
- Manuel Marques Grangeiro
- Francisco de Assis Barbosa
- Francisco Manuel Martins Ramos

=== Amazonas Province ===
- João Lopes da Cunha

=== Bahia Province ===
- Cipriano Barata
- Alexandre Gomes de Argolo Ferrão
- Marcos Antônio de Sousa
- Pedro Rodrigues Bandeira
- José Lino dos Santos Coutinho
- Domingos Borges de Barros
- Luís Paulino de Oliveira Pinto da França
- Francisco Agostinho Gomes
- Luís José de Barros Leite

=== Ceará Province ===
- Antônio José Moreira
- Manuel do Nascimento Castro e Silva
- José Martiniano Pereira de Alencar
- Pedro José da Costa Barros

=== Espírito Santo Province ===
- João Fortunato Ramos dos Santos

=== Goiás Province ===
- Joaquim Teotônio Segurado

=== Maranhão Province ===
- Joaquim Vieira Belford
- José João Beckman e Caldas

=== Minas Gerais Province ===
- Belchior Pinheiro de Oliveira
- Manuel Ferreira da Câmara Bittencourt Aguiar e Sá
- José Teixeira da Fonseca Vasconcelos
- Manuel Rodrigues da Costa
- Estêvão Ribeiro de Resende
- José Alves do Couto Saraiva
- Jacinto Furtado de Mendonça
- João Severiano Maciel da Costa
- Lucas Antônio Monteiro de Barros
- José de Resende Costa (son)
- Teotônio Alves de Oliveira Maciel
- Antônio Teixeira da Costa
- José de Oliveira Pinto Botelho e Mosqueira
- Manuel Veloso Soares
- João Gomes da Silveira Mendonça
- José Joaquim da Rocha
- Francisco Pereira de Santa Apolônia
- João Evangelista de Faria Lobato
- José Antônio da Silva Maia
- Lúcio Soares Teixeira de Gouveia
- Antônio da Rocha Froes
- Cândido José de Araújo Viana
- Antônio Gonçalves Gomide
- Domingos Alves de Oliveira Maciel
- José Custódio Dias
- João Gomes da Silveira Mendonça
- Francisco de Paula Pereira Duarte
- José Cesário de Miranda Ribeiro
- José Elói Ottoni

=== Pará Province ===
- Romualdo de Sousa Coelho
- Romualdo Antônio de Seixas
- Francisco de Sousa Moreira

=== Paraíba Province ===
- Francisco Xavier Monteiro de França
- José da Costa Cirne

=== Pernambuco Province ===
- Domingos Malaquias de Aguiar Pires Ferreira
- Gervásio Pires Ferreira
- Inácio Pinto de Almeida Castro
- Félix José Tavares de Lira
- Manuel Zeferino dos Santos
- Pedro de Araújo Lima
- João Ferreira da Silva
- Francisco Muniz Tavares
- Antônio de Pádua Vieira Cavalcanti (alternate)
- Francisco Xavier de Lossio e Seiblitz (alternate)
- Manuel Félix de Veras

=== Piauí Province ===
- Domingos da Conceição
- Manuel de Sousa Borges Leal

=== Rio de Janeiro Province ===
- Custódio Gonçalves Ledo
- João Soares de Lemos Brandão
- Francisco Lemos de Faria Pereira Coutinho
- José Joaquim da Cunha Azeredo Coutinho
- Luis Martins Bastos
- Joaquim Gonçalves Ledo
- Francisco Vilela Barbosa
- Luis Nicolau Fagundes Varela

=== Rio Grande do Sul Province ===
- João de Santa Bárbara
- José Martins Zimblão (alternate)
- José Saturnino da Costa Pereira

=== Santa Catarina Province ===
- Lourenço Rodrigues de Andrade
- José da Silva Mafra (alternate)

=== São Paulo Province ===
- Antônio Carlos Ribeiro de Andrada (did not sign or swear an oath to the 1822 constitution)
- Nicolau Pereira de Campos Vergueiro (did not sign or swear an oath to the 1822 constitution)
- José Ricardo da Costa Aguiar de Andrada (did not sign or swear an oath to the 1822 constitution)
- Diogo Antônio Feijó (did not sign or swear an oath to the 1822 constitution)
- José Feliciano Fernandes Pinheiro (signed and swore an oath to the 1822 constitution)
- Antônio Manuel da Silva Bueno (alternate; did not sign or swear an oath to the 1822 constitution)
- Antônio Pais de Barros (did not take his seat)
- Francisco de Paula Sousa e Melo (did not attend)

== Brazilian representatives who approved the constitution ==
On 23 September 1822 the constitution was approved. Among those voting in favour were 36 Brazilian representatives, including 25 from the northeast. This did not include the Brazilians who had abandoned the Cortes, like Cipriano Barata and Antônio Carlos de Andrada e Silva.

- Alexandre Gomes de Argolo Ferrão, Bahia
- Antônio José Moreira, Ceará
- Domingos Borges de Barros, Bahia
- Custódio Gonçalves Ledo, Rio de Janeiro
- Domingos da Conceição, Piauí
- Domingos Malaquias de Aguiar Pires Ferreira, Pernambuco
- Félix José Tavares de Lira, Pernambuco
- Francisco de Assis Barbosa, Alagoas
- Francisco Manuel Martins Ramos, Alagoas
- Francisco Moniz Tavares, Pernambuco
- Francisco de Sousa Moreira, Pará
- Francisco Vilela Barbosa, Rio de Janeiro
- Francisco Xavier Monteiro de França, Paraíba
- Inácio Pinto de Almeida Castro, Pernambuco
- João Ferreira da Silva, Pernambuco
- João Lopes da Cunha, Rio Negro (Amazonas)
- João Soares de Lemos Brandão, Rio de Janeiro
- Joaquim Teotônio Segurado, Goiás
- José da Costa Cirne, Paraíba
- José João Beckman e Caldas, Maranhão
- José Lino dos Santos Coutinho, Bahia
- José Martiniano Pereira de Alencar, Ceará
- José Feliciano Fernandes Pinheiro, São Paulo
- Lourenço Rodrigues de Andrade, Santa Catarina
- Luis Martins Bastos, Rio de Janeiro
- Luiz Nicolau Fagundes Varella, Rio de Janeiro
- Manuel Filippe Gonçalves, Ceará
- Manuel Felix de Veras, Pernambuco
- Manuel Marques Grangeiro, Alagoas
- Manuel do Nascimento Castro e Silva, Ceará
- Manuel Zeferino dos Santos, Pernambuco
- Marcos Antônio de Sousa, Bahia
- Miguel Sousa Borges Leal, Piauí
- Pedro de Araújo Lima, Pernambuco
- Pedro Rodrigues Bandeira, Bahia
- Romualdo de Sousa Coelho, (Bishop) Pará

== See also ==
- Cortes (politics)
