= Domingos Pires Ferreira (priest) =

Brazilian priest

- Born: 1753; São Frei Pedro Gonçalves, Recife
- Died: Unknown; Recife
- Occupation: Priest
- Parents: Domingos Pires Ferreira (father); Joana Maria de Deus Correia Pinto (mother)
- Family: Pires Ferreira
- Religion: Roman catholic
- Ordained: priest of the Catholic Church

Domingos Pires Ferreira (born 1753) was a liberal priest.

== Biography ==
Domingos was born in the freguesia São Frei Pedro Gonçalves, Recife in 1753 to the merchant Domingos Pires Ferreira and his wife Joana Maria de Deus Correia Pinto.

He entered the University of Coimbra on 1 October 1770, becoming a priest. On 3 March 1772, he began his law studies. He also studied in Salamanca, Spain.

In 1836, Luiz Cavalcanti tried to pass the so-called Mayor Law, which reverted the liberal reforms for more independence from the Empire of Brazil and centralized the nomination of vital political roles in the state of Pernambuco. José Tavares Gomes da Fonseca wrote an article on Diário de Pernambuco, summoning a meeting on 8 April in front of the Church of São Francisco to sign an application against the law, but the police surrounded the area to scare people away. Domingos was one of the six people who tried, nonetheless, to collect the signatures.

Domingos died in Recife on an unknown date.
