= Domingos Pires Ferreira (merchant) =

Portuguese merchant, born 1718

- Born: 1718; Bustelo, Chaves, Portugal
- Died: c. 1791; Recife, Brazil
- Occupations: Merchant, rancher
- Spouse: Joana Maria de Deus Correia Pinto
- Children: 14, including Gervásio, José, Joaquim, João de Deus and Domingos
- Parents: Domingos Pires Ferreira (father); Domingas Gonçalves Ferreira (mother)
- Family: Pires Ferreira

Domingos Pires Ferreira (1718 – c. 1791) was a Portuguese merchant who lived in Colonial Brazil. He was very rich and influential at his time, and responsible for the instauration of the Pires Ferreira family in Brazil.

== Early life ==
Domingos Pires Ferreira was born in 1718 on Bustelo, freguesia of Santa Maria Madalena da Vila da Ponte, comarca of Chaves, province of Trás-os-Montes, Portugal. He was the son of the farmer Domingos Pires Ferreira, nicknamed Penedo, and Domingas Gonçalves Ferreira.

In 1725, Domingos moved to Recife, Pernambuco, Brazil, and lived with his uncle, the merchant Manuel Alves Ferreira.

== Career ==
By 1745, he was already one of the richest men from Recife. Amongst the roles he has partaken, was as elected member of the Corpo do Comércio in 1764, 1769, 1774 and 1781, inspector for the businessmen, storekeeper for Fazenda Real in 22 December 1767 and municipal official for Recife in 1771.

Domingos also started the cattle industry and bought lands in Parnaíba, Piauí.

In 1761, João da Costa Monteiro Júnior won the election as the Director of the Companhia Geral de Comércio de Pernambuco e Paraíba against Luís Ferreira de Moura, but the election was deemed as fraudulent due several reasons. Amongst the reasons, 18 merchants, including Domingos, alleged that they had not been told about the election.

== Personal life ==
Domingos married Joana Maria de Deus Correia Pinto on 5 February 1748. She was the daughter of the merchant Captain Antonio Correia Pinto and Leandra da Costa Lima.

They had 14 children; Antonio, Leandra, Caetana Maria de Deus, Domingos, Manoel, José, Anna Maria de Deus, João de Deus, Maria do Sacramento, Joaquim, Catharina Rita do Nascimento, Gervásio, Anna and João.

Domingos died in c. 1791.

== Titles ==
Domingos was a member of Venerável Ordem III de São Francisco do Recife, Brother and Judge of the Irmandade do Santíssimo Sacramento de São Frei Pedro Gonçalves and a familiar of the Holy Office.
