= Gervásio Pires =

Brazilian merchant, industrialist and politician (1765–1836)

His Excellency Gervásio Pires
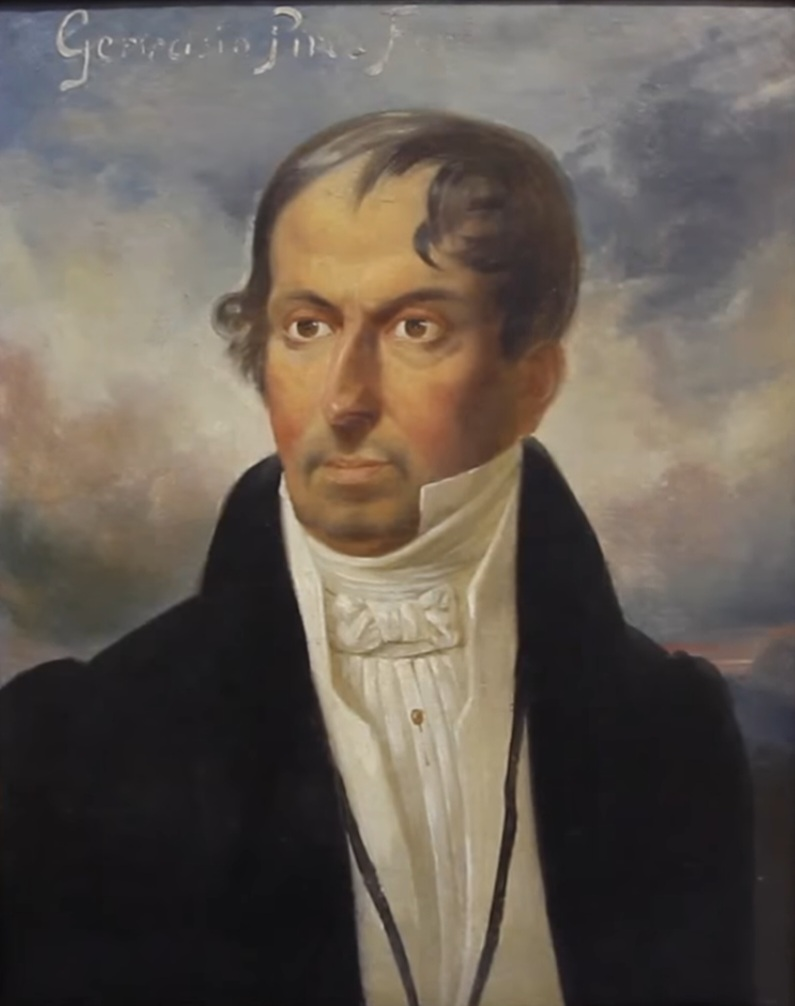
- Portrait attributed to Porto Alegre, c. 1830

President of the Provisional Junta of Pernambuco
- In office 28 October 1821 – 17 September 1822
- Preceded by: Luís do Rego (as governor)
- Succeeded by: 4th Government Junta

Provincial Legislator of the Legislative Assembly of Pernambuco
- In office 1835 – 30 April 1835

Personal details
- Born: 26 June 1765 São Frei Pedro Gonçalves, Recife, Brazil
- Died: 9 March 1836 (aged 70) Recife, Brazil
- Cause of death: Diabetes
- Spouse: D. Genoveva Perpétua de Jesus Caldas (m. 1792)
- Children: 10
- Parent: Domingos Pires Ferreira (father)
- Family: Pires Ferreira

Gervásio Pires Ferreira (26 June 1765 – 9 March 1836) was a Brazilian merchant, industrialist and politician, president of the junta that governed Pernambuco from 28 October 1821 until its deposition 17 September 1822. He participated in the Pernambuco Revolt of 1817, where he was arrested, and in the Beberibe Convention in 1821.

== Early life ==
Gervásio Pires Ferreira was born in the freguesia (parish) of São Frei Pedro Gonçalves, Recife, Pernambuco, in the early hours of the morning of 26 June 1765, being the twelfth child of the rich Portuguese trader Domingos Pires Ferreira and his wife D. Joana Maria de Deus, born in Pernambuco. After finishing primary school here, his parents made him go to the College of Mafra, in Portugal, between ages 11 and 12, where he studied Humanities. He moved to Coimbra, enrolling in the Faculty of Mathematics of the University of Coimbra. Later, due to a constant tradition in the family, he dedicated himself more freely to studying Law. Due to the fact that he was myopic, he had to stop studying due to serious complications.

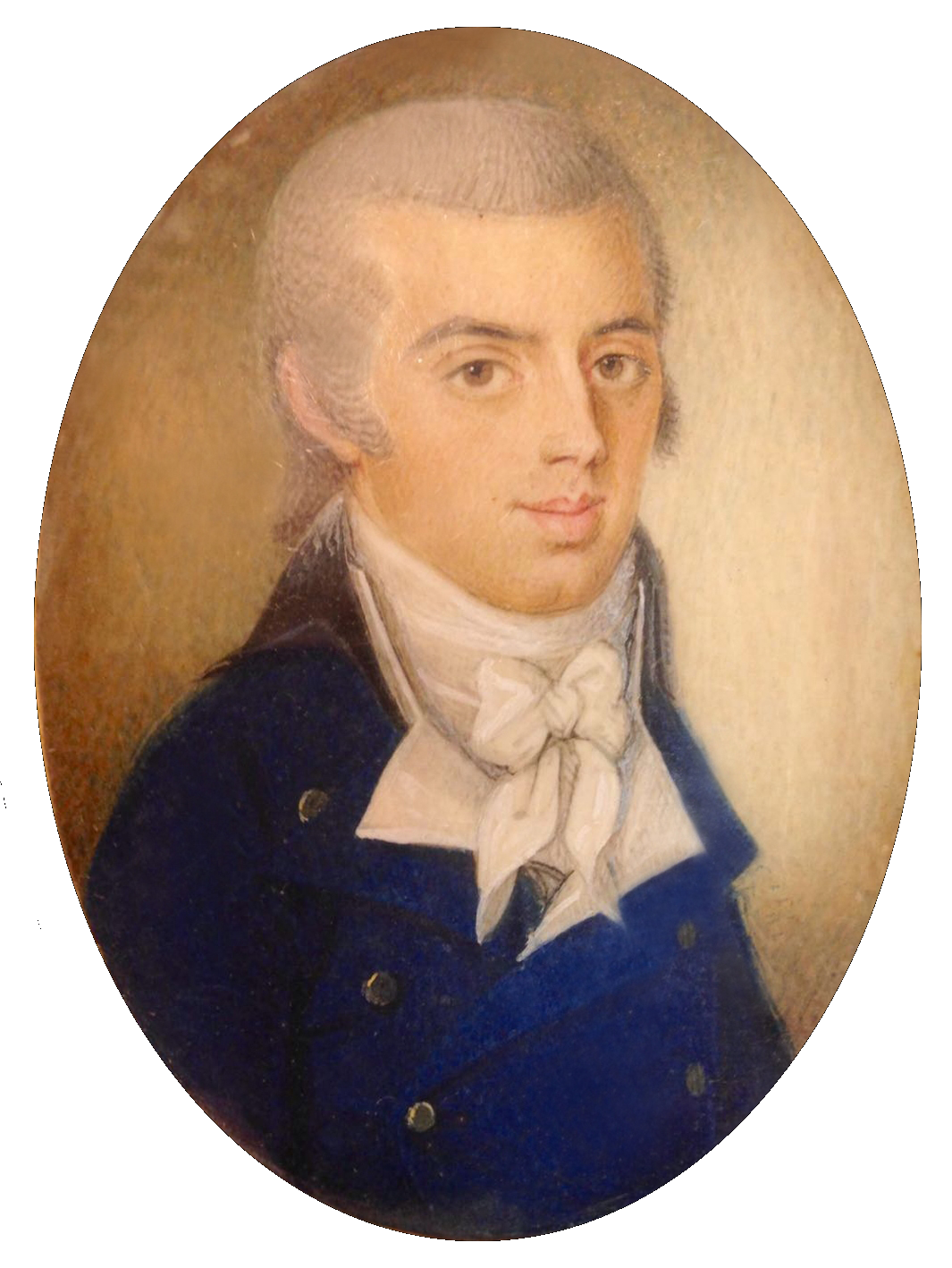
Portrait at the age of 27, 1792

He returned to Pernambuco, where his father then indicated him to follow an ecclesiastical career, but, disgusted by him, he returned to Lisbon, registered as a trader in that large city and dedicated everything to commerce. He married in the same city on 8 July 1792 with D. Genoveva Perpétua de Jesus Caldas, daughter of the rich businessman José Pereira de Sousa Caldas, who was also the uncle of the Brazilian poet Sousa Caldas, and his wife D. Teresa Joaquina de Jesus Caldas.

== Career and later life ==
When the Portuguese court departed to Brazil during the French invasion in 1807, Gervásio Pires left Lisbon on his own ship, the Espada de Ferro, with all his family and wealth, returning to Pernambuco at the beginning of 1809, where he continued his life as a businessman, being the first to undertake and carry out navigation and direct trade from Pernambuco to Asia. His ship, and then another, were the first to sail directly to Asia, and sometimes they traded goods between the ports of Pernambuco and Calcutta.

During the Pernambuco Revolt in 1817, Gervásio Pires got involved with the rebels and offered the Espada de Ferro and 25,000 réis to Antônio Gonçalves da Cruz "Cabugá", the rebel ambassador sent to the United States seeking recognition of the republic. On 11 March, he received from the rebels the position of "President of the National Treasury", replacing Cruz Cabugá, being tasked with examining the republic's fiscal system and to propose reforms and improvements that he considered necessary.

Shortly afterwards he was elected advisor, and with the end of the republic, he was arrested on 25 May 1817, and taken with many others in the locked hold of the ship Carrasco to the prisons of the city of Bahia. He was judged and later given pardon by royal charter of 9 March 1819, being released from prison on 22 February 1821.

When Pernambuco rebelled again in 1821, Gervásio Pires offered himself to the governor, Luís do Rego, to be one of those sent to the Junta of Goiana tasked with proposing peace for the last time. They achieved an armistice, and a resolution from the Cortes Gerais ordered to elect a Junta and bring the governor back to Lisbon.

An electoral college reunited in the nave of the Cathedral of Saint Saviour of the World in Olinda, and they nominated him President of the Junta. His inauguration took place on 28 October 1821, and he stayed in office until 17 September 1822, when he was deposed after a sedition, ten days after the Independence of Brazil. According to his biographer Antônio Joaquim de Melo, he was calumniated by Martim Francisco, who accused him of being against the independence. Gervásio's fall was articulated by Bernardo José da Gama e José Fernandes, as he was considered suspicious of having secret intentions of declaring Pernambuco a republic, due his involvement with the Pernambucan revolt.

In 1823, he wrote Processo, e Defesa de Gervásio Pires Ferreira, Preso na Cadeia da Bahia pelos Acontecimentos de Pernambuco em 1817, a book describing his process and defense after the events of 1817.

In c. 1826, Gervásio inaugurated a textile factory in Recife, the first from Pernambuco and the second from Brazil.

In 1835, he was elected as a Provincial Legislator for the 1st Assembly of Pernambuco with 236 votes. As a moderated liberal, he was the most active Legislator from the Assembly and proposed several projects. His most infamous project was a bill that aimed to normalize the currency from the province to fight the production of falsified coins, but he was antagonized by some of the other Legislators, most notoriously Miguel do Sacramento Lopes Gama, arguing that this was the responsibility from the General Assembly. Frustrated for the denial of his bill, Gervásio renounced on 30 April claiming he was sick and "his works didn't correspond with his wishes."

He died of diabetes in the evening of 9 March 1836, and left ten children. He was buried in the Church of Our Lady of the Rosary of the Black Men, in the freguesia (nowadays a bairro [neighborhood]) of Boa Vista, Recife.
