= Joaquim Pires Ferreira =

Brazilian merchant

- Born: 1761; São Frei Pedro Gonçalves, Recife
- Died: Unknown
- Occupation: Merchant
- Spouse: Joanna Francisca Anastácia Pereira de Bastos
- Children: 4
- Parents: Domingos Pires Ferreira (father); Joana Maria de Deus Correia Pinto (mother)
- Family: Pires Ferreira

Joaquim Pires Ferreira (born 1761) was a merchant from Recife. He was part of the Pernambucan Revolt and later worked as member of Junta of the National Treasury of Pernambuco.

== Biography ==
Joaquim Pires Ferreira was born in 1761 on freguesia de São Frei Pedro Gonçalves, Recife. Son of Domingos Pires Ferreira with Joanna Maria de Deus Correia Pinto, he was the 5th youngest of 14 siblings.

In 1779, he studied at University of Coimbra, but didn't graduate. He then became a merchant in Recife. He was also a slave owner.

In 1817, he and his siblings were part of the Pernambucan Revolt. He was arrested after the failure of the revolt, but he was released on 6 February 1818.

After the revolt, he became member of Junta of the National Treasury, where he stayed until he died. In 1823, he and other members of the board issued a statement that the public expenditure of the Pernambuco Province was raising since the failure of the revolt. The Pernambuco government asked Dom Pedro I to stop paying tribute, but it was denied and the monarch suggested the sale of all brazilwood from the Province to liquidate their debt with Bank of Brazil. He was also part of the opposition against José Joaquim da Cunha de Azeredo Coutinho, and asked Maria Leopoldina of Austria for the liquidation of the "literary subsidy" over the dried meat that came from Rio Grande do Sul.

Joaquim died on an unknown date. It is known he was alive on 8 November 1830, as he was present at the baptism of his grandchild, Joanna Joaquina Pires Machado Portella.

== Personal life ==
Joaquim married with Joanna Francisca Anastácia Pereira de Bastos in Recife, 1798. They had four children, Joanna Joaquina, Joaquina Rosa Bonifácia, Ignacia Severina and Maria Francisca.
