= Beberibe Convention =

1821 armed movement in Brazil

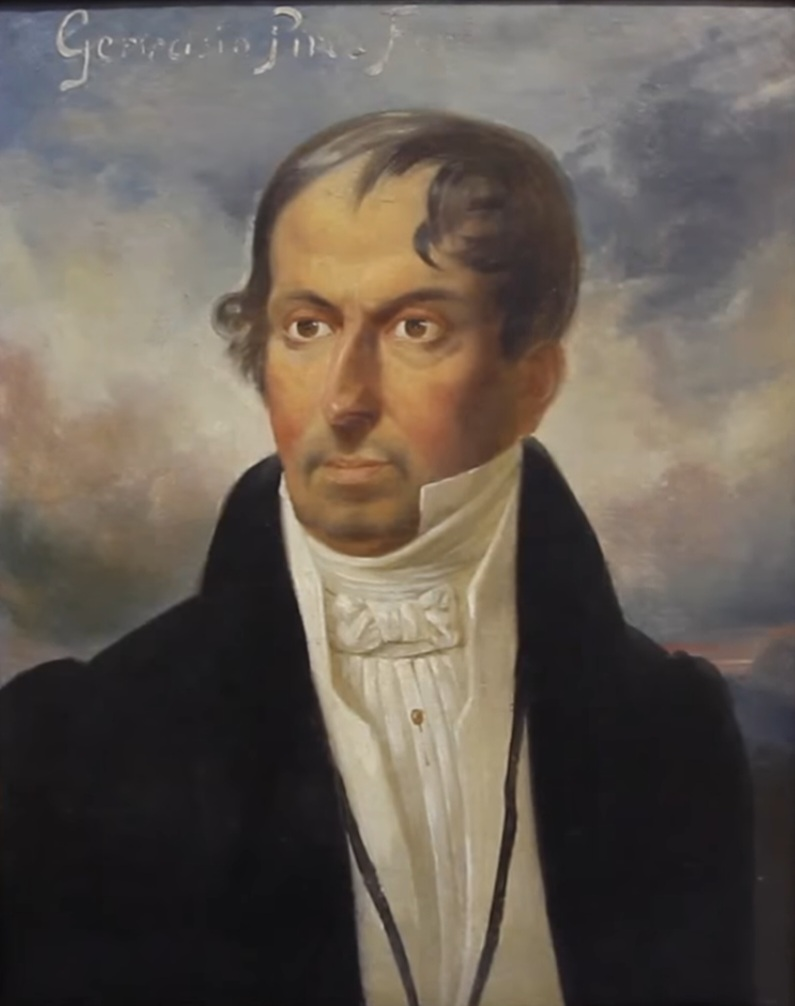
Gervásio Pires was acclaimed president of the so-called "Junta de Goiana", and assumed the government of Pernambuco.

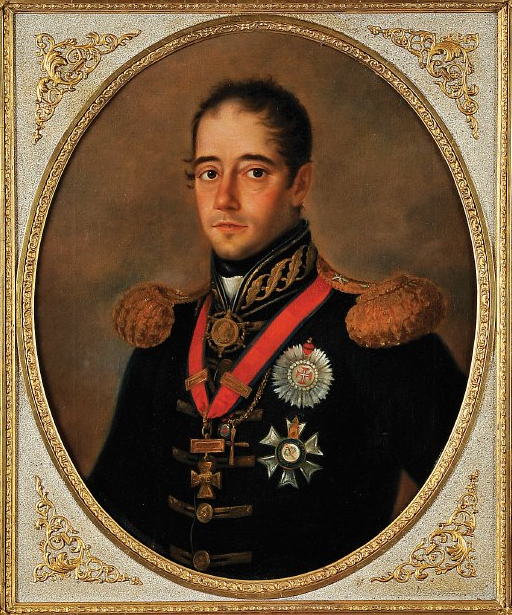
Luís do Rego, the executioner of the Pernambucan Revolt, returned to Portugal in 1821.

The Beberibe Convention, also known as the Constitutionalist Movement of 1821, refers to an armed rebellion that culminated in the expulsion of the Portuguese troops from the then Brazilian province of Pernambuco. The conflict is often cited as the beginning of the Brazilian War of Independence.

== The movement ==
Pernambuco was the first Brazilian province to secede from the Kingdom of Portugal. On 29 August 1821, an armed movement began against Captain-General Luís do Rego Barreto—the executioner of the Pernambuco Revolt—culminating in the formation of the Junta of Goiana, which was victorious with the surrender of the Portuguese troops in a capitulation signed on 5 October of the same year, at the Beberibe Convention, which expelled the Portuguese troops from Pernambuco.

The Constitutionalist Movement of 1821 is often considered the first episode of the Independence of Brazil.

== See also ==
- Pernambucan revolt
- Independence of Brazil
- Independence of Bahia
