= United Kingdom of Portugal, Brazil and the Algarves =

Pluricontinental monarchy (1815–1825)

Coordinates: 22°54′S 43°14′W

United Kingdom of Portugal, Brazil and the Algarves Reino Unido de Portugal, Brasil e Algarves
- 1815–1825
- Flag Coat of arms
- Anthem: Hymno Patriotico
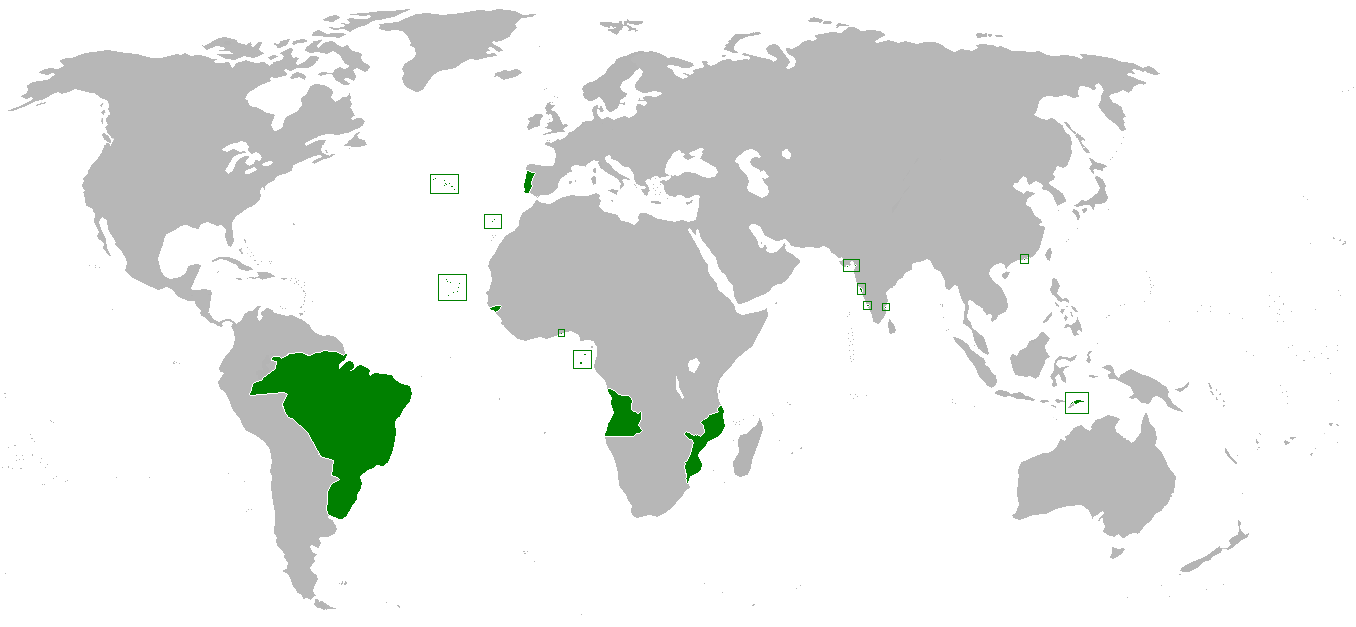
- The United Kingdom of Portugal, Brazil and the Algarves with its colonies
- Capital: Rio de Janeiro (until 1821) Lisbon (after 1821)
- Common languages: Portuguese
- Religion: Roman Catholicism
- Government: Absolute monarchy under real union (before 1822) Federal constitutional monarchy (after 1822)
- Monarch
  - 1815–1816: Maria I
  - 1816–1825: John VI
- Regent
  - 1815–1816: Prince John
  - 1821–1825: Prince Pedro (Kingdom of Brazil only)
- Legislature: Cortes Gerais (1822–1823)
- History
  - Established: 16 December 1815
  - Liberal Revolution: 24 August 1820
  - Independence of Brazil: 7 September 1822
  - Constitution adopted: 23 September 1822
  - Disestablished: 29 August 1825

Population
  - 1820: 4,000,000 (Brazil), 3,000,000 (Portugal)
- Currency: Real
Preceded by	Succeeded by
History of Portugal (1777–1834); State of Brazil	Kingdom of Portugal (1777–1834); Empire of Brazil

The United Kingdom of Portugal, Brazil and the Algarves was a pluricontinental monarchy formed by the elevation of the Portuguese colony named State of Brazil to the status of a kingdom and by the simultaneous union of that Kingdom of Brazil with the Kingdom of Portugal and the Kingdom of the Algarves, constituting a single state consisting of three kingdoms.

The United Kingdom of Portugal, Brazil and the Algarves was formed in 1815, following the transfer of the Portuguese court to Brazil during the Napoleonic invasions of Portugal, and it continued to exist for about one year after the court's return to Europe, being de facto dissolved in 1822, when Brazil proclaimed its independence. The dissolution of the United Kingdom was accepted by Portugal and formalized de jure in 1825, when Portugal recognized the independent Empire of Brazil.

During its period of existence the United Kingdom of Portugal, Brazil and the Algarves did not correspond to the whole of the Portuguese Empire: rather, the United Kingdom was the transatlantic metropolis that controlled the Portuguese colonial empire, with its other overseas possessions in Africa and Asia.

Thus, from the point of view of Brazil, the elevation to the rank of a kingdom and the creation of the United Kingdom represented a change in status, from that of a colony to that of an equal member of a political union. In the wake of the Liberal Revolution of 1820 in Portugal, attempts to compromise the autonomy and even the unity of Brazil, led to the breakdown of the union.

== History ==
=== Establishment ===
The United Kingdom of Portugal, Brazil and the Algarves came into being in the wake of Portugal's war with Napoleonic France. The Portuguese Prince Regent (the future King John VI), with his incapacitated mother (Queen Maria I of Portugal) and the Royal Court, fled to the colony of Brazil in 1808.

With the defeat of Napoleon in 1815, there were calls for the return of the Portuguese Monarch to Lisbon. The Portuguese Prince Regent enjoyed life in Rio de Janeiro, where the monarchy was more popular and where he had more freedom, and he was thus unwilling to return to Europe. However, those advocating the return of the court to Lisbon argued that Brazil was only a colony and that it was not right for Portugal to be governed from a colony. On the other hand, leading Brazilian courtiers pressed for the elevation of Brazil from the rank of a colony, so that they could enjoy the full status of being nationals of the mother-country. Brazilian nationalists also supported the move, because it indicated that Brazil would no longer be submissive to the interests of Portugal, but would be of equal status within a transatlantic monarchy.

By a law issued by the Prince Regent on 16 December 1815, the colony of Brazil was thus elevated to the rank of a kingdom and by the same law the separate kingdoms of Portugal, Brazil and the Algarves were united as a single state under the title of The United Kingdom of Portugal, Brazil and the Algarves.

This united kingdom included the historical Kingdom of the Algarves, which is the present-day Portuguese region of Algarve.

The titles of the Portuguese royalty were changed to reflect the creation of this transatlantic united kingdom. The styles of the Queen and of the Prince Regent were changed accordingly to Queen and Prince Regent of the United Kingdom of Portugal, Brazil and the Algarves. The title Prince of Brazil, a title that used to pertain to the heir apparent of the Portuguese Crown, was dropped shortly afterwards, in 1817, being replaced by the title of Prince Royal of the United Kingdom of Portugal, Brazil and the Algarves, or Prince Royal for short. A new flag and coat of arms were also adopted for the new state.

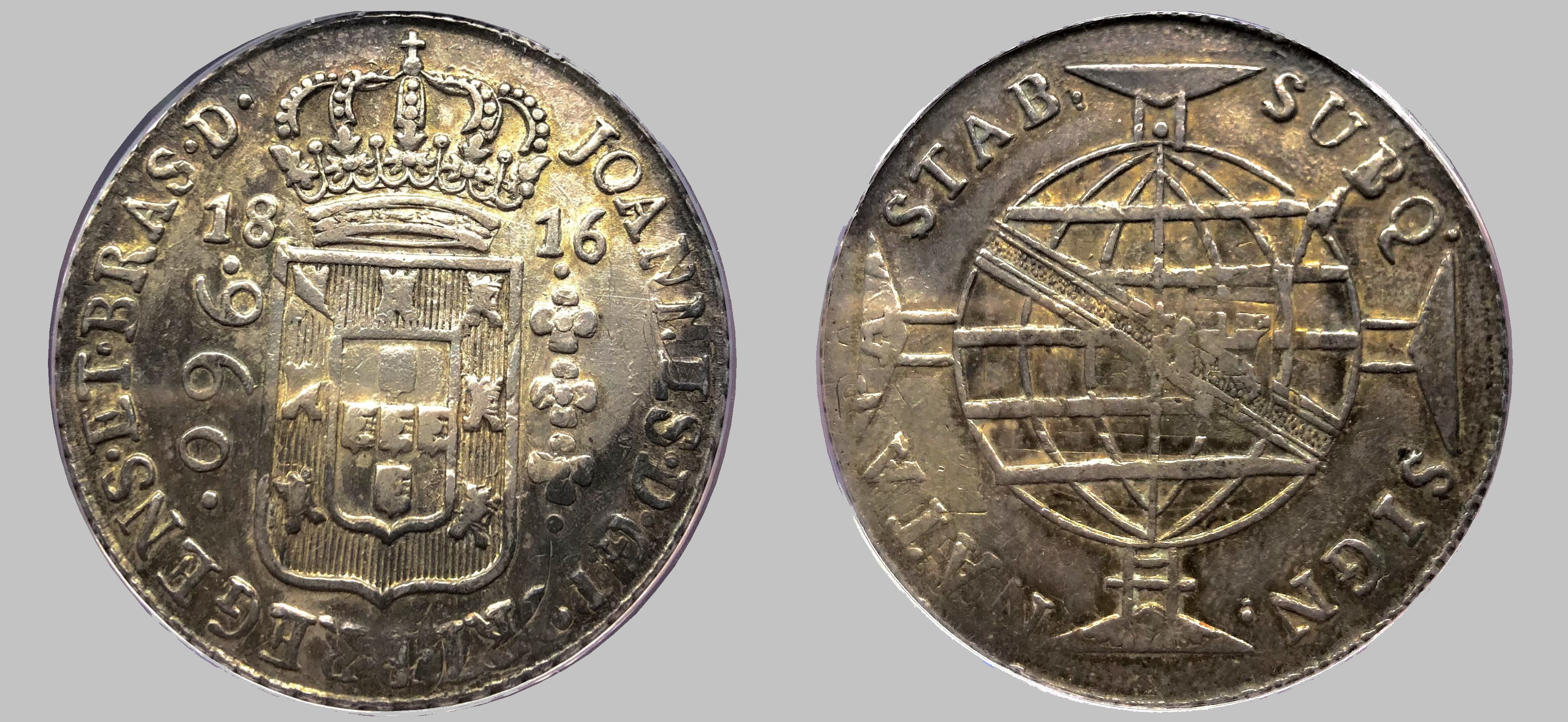
Brazil 1816 960 reis, Overstruck over Spanish 8 Reales.

=== Succession of John VI ===
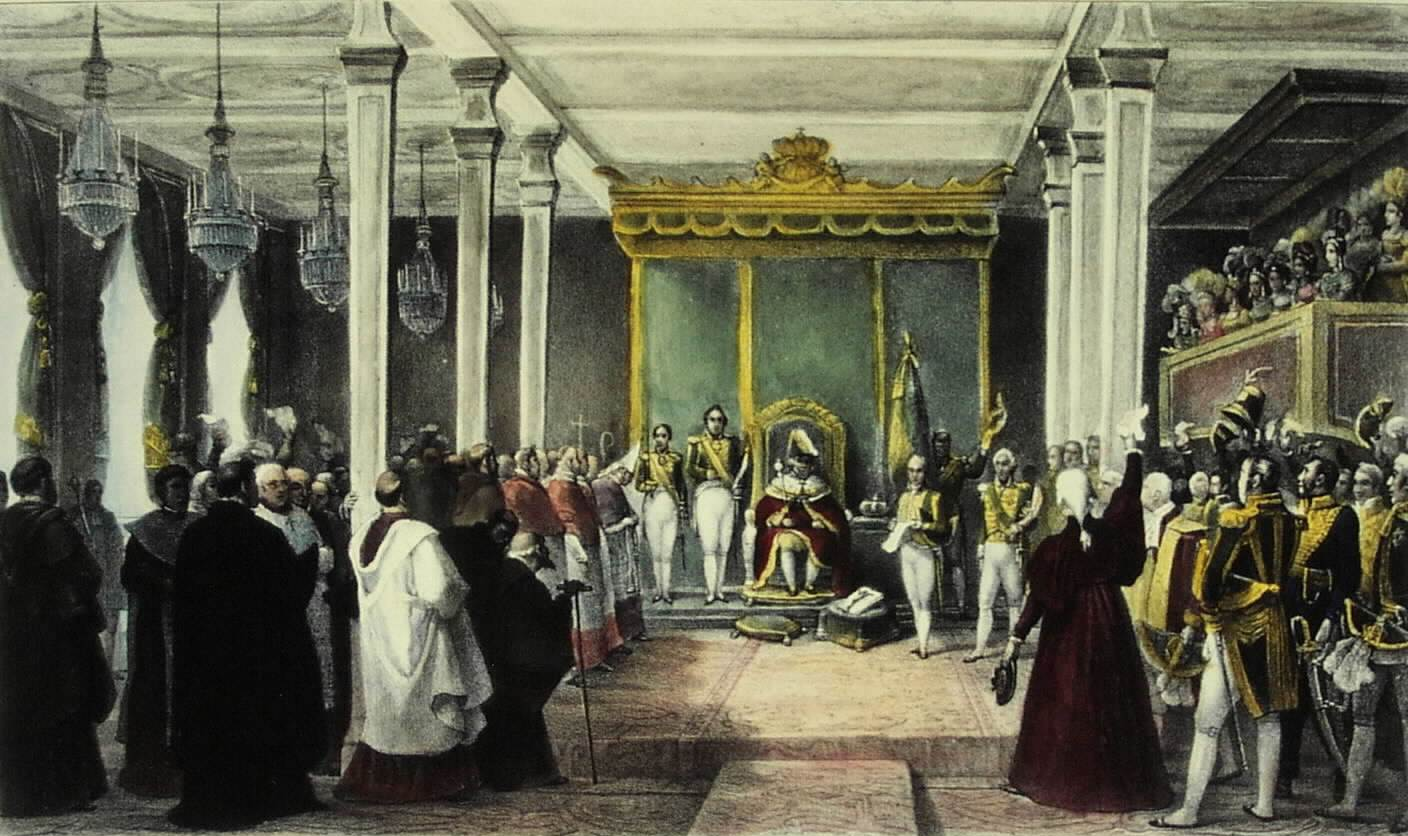
The acclamation of King João VI of the United Kingdom of Portugal, Brazil and the Algarves in Rio de Janeiro

On 20 March 1816 Queen Maria I died in Rio de Janeiro. Prince John, the Prince Regent, then became King John VI, the second monarch of the United Kingdom, retaining the numbering of Portuguese Sovereigns. After a period of mourning and several delays, the festivities of the acclamation of the new King were held in Rio de Janeiro on 6 February 1818.

On the date of his Acclamation, King John VI created the Order of the Immaculate Conception of Vila Viçosa, the only order of knighthood to be created during the United Kingdom era. This Order existed in the United Kingdom alongside the old Portuguese Orders of chivalry and the Order of the Tower and Sword, an ancient Order that had been dormant and that was revived by the Portuguese monarchy in November 1808, when the royal court was already in Brazil. After the dissolution of the United Kingdom, while Brazilian branches of the old Orders of chivalry were created, resulting in Brazilian and Portuguese Orders Saint James of the Sword, of Saint Benedict of Aviz, and of Christ (there was and is also a branch of the Order of Christ maintained by the Holy See: the Supreme Order of Our Lord Jesus Christ), paradoxically, the newer Orders (the recreated Order of the Tower and Sword and the Order of the Immaculate Conception of Vila Viçosa) remained in existence as Portuguese Orders only.

=== John VI's return to Europe ===
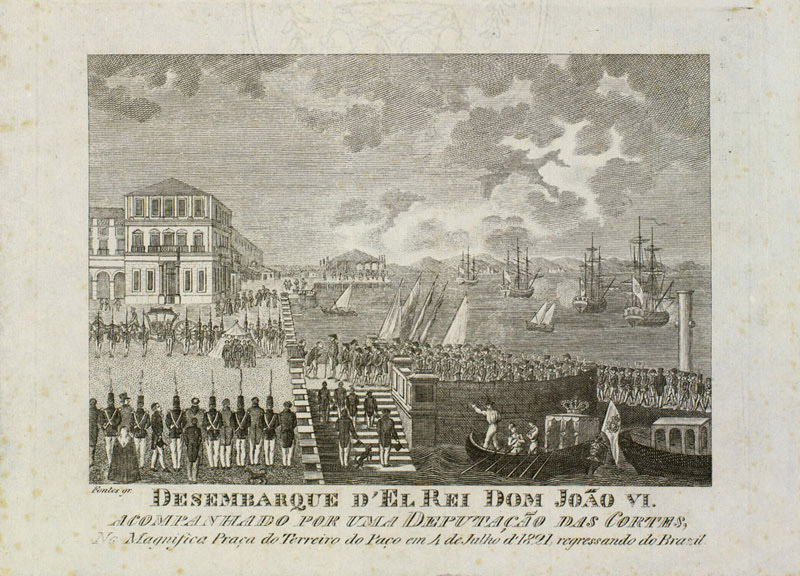
King John disembarks in Lisbon in 1821, after 13 years in Brazil

After the Liberal Revolution of 1820 in Portugal, the King left Brazil and returned to the European portion of the United Kingdom, arriving in Lisbon on 4 July 1821. Before his departure, the King, acceding to requests made by Brazilian courtiers, decided to leave behind his heir apparent, Prince Pedro, the Prince Royal of the United Kingdom. By a decree issued on 22 April 1821, the King invested Pedro with the title of "Regent of Brazil", and granted him delegated powers to discharge the "general government and entire administration of the Kingdom of Brazil" as the King's placeholder, thus granting the Kingdom of Brazil a devolved administration within the United Kingdom.

Accordingly, with the appointment of Prince Royal Pedro as Regent of Brazil, the Brazilian provinces – that in the colonial period were united under a vice-regal administration, and that during the stay of Queen Maria I and King John VI in the American Continent remained united directly under the royal Government – continued, after the return of the King and of the Portuguese court to Europe, united under a central Brazilian Government based in Rio de Janeiro.

Prince Pedro's Regency not only assured the unity of the Brazilian people under one government, but it also enjoyed a high degree of autonomy vis-à-vis the Government of the United Kingdom.

Attempts by the Government in Lisbon to terminate Brazil's home rule and to undermine Brazilian unity would lead to the proclamation of the independence of Brazil and the dissolution of the United Kingdom.

=== Dissolution of the United Kingdom ===
==== Lead-up to the dissolution ====
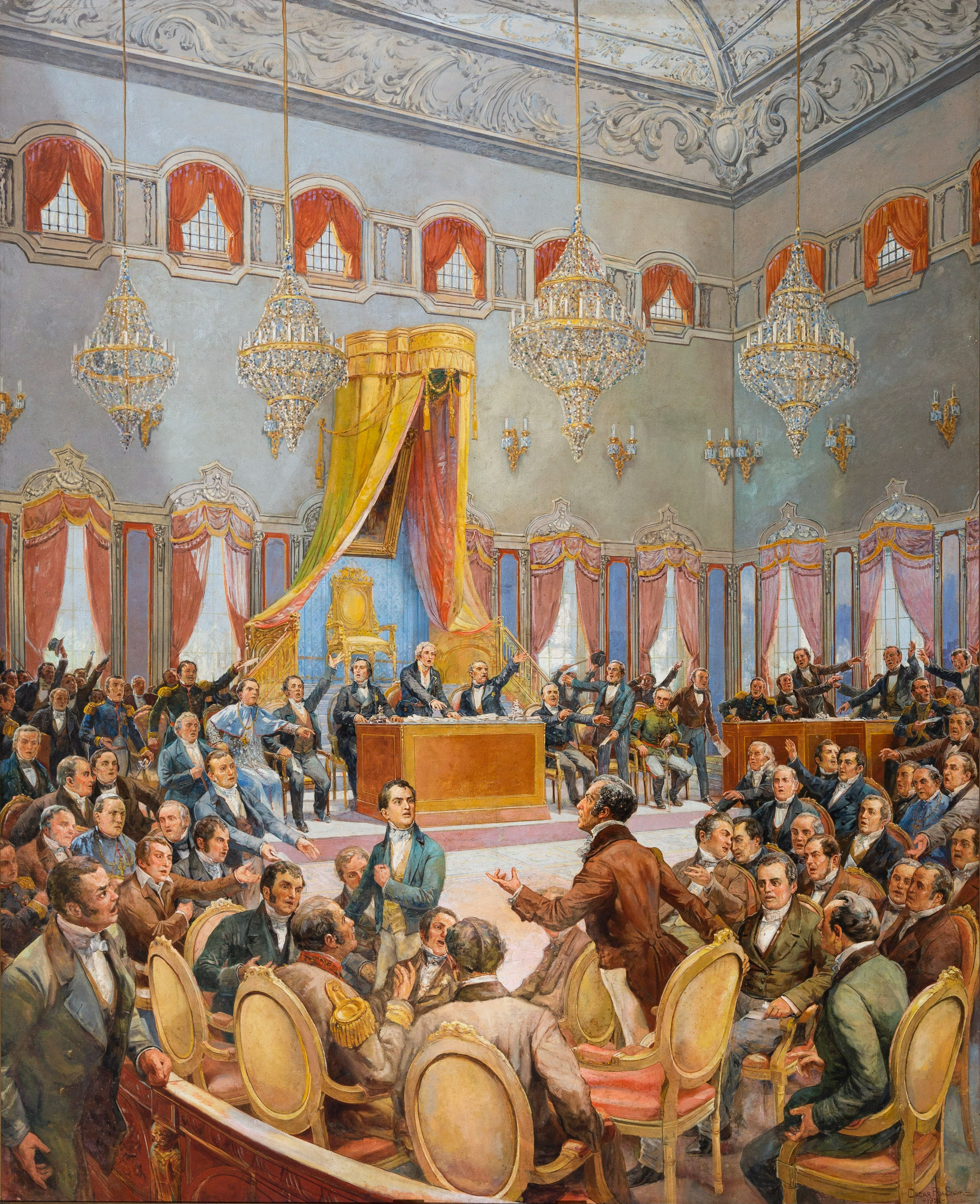
The Cortes of the United Kingdom of Portugal, Brazil and the Algarves assembled in Lisbon in the wake of the 1820 Portuguese Revolution.

The Cortes (the Parliament) assembled in Lisbon in the wake of the Constitutional Revolution of 1820 to draft a Constitution for the United Kingdom was composed of mostly Portuguese delegates. This was so because the Revolution was Portuguese in origin, so that the members of the Cortes were elected in Portugal, and only later a Brazilian delegation was elected and the Brazilian delegates crossed the Atlantic to join the ongoing deliberations. Also, Brazilian representatives were often mistreated and persecuted in the streets by Portuguese citizens who resented the end of colonial rule. On top of that, Brazilians were under-represented in the Cortes.

As for the King, upon his arrival in Lisbon, he behaved as though he accepted the new political settlement that resulted from the Liberal Revolution (a posture he would maintain until mid-1823), but the powers of the Crown were severely limited. A Council of Regency that had been elected by the Cortes to govern Portugal in the wake of the Revolution – and that replaced by force the previous governors that administered the European portion of the United Kingdom by royal appointment – handed back the reins of government to the Monarch on his arrival in Lisbon, but the King was now limited to the discharge of the Executive branch, and had no influence over the drafting of the Constitution or over the actions of the Cortes.

The Constituent Cortes, dominated by a Portuguese majority, included provisions in the Constitution being drafted that referred to the people of the United Kingdom as "the Portuguese Nation". The draft Constitution spoke of "Portuguese citizens of both hemispheres". Apart from including language in the Constitution that was seen as hostile and offensive to Brazilians, the United Kingdom Cortes assembled in Lisbon included in the proposed Constitution provisions that would undermine and potentially lead to the dissolution of the central Brazilian government based in Rio de Janeiro. The draft Constitution would have maintained the Regency of the Kingdom of Brazil, but it contained provisions allowing the United Kingdom Legislature to exclude Brazilian provinces from the jurisdiction of the Regency. Thus, the government of the United Kingdom in Lisbon would have the power to sever the links between a Brazilian province and the central Brazilian government, submitting this province directly to the Lisbon Government. If enacted, those deliberations of the Cortes would not only undermine Brazilian home rule, but they would also endanger the unity of the Brazilian people, as Brazilians would no longer have a central government, a situation that did not even exist in the last centuries of the colonial period. Portuguese deputies in the Cortes even introduced draft legislation that would concretely sever the ties between the central devolved government of the Kingdom of Brazil in Rio de Janeiro and some provinces in Northeastern Brazil. The Portuguese Cortes also demanded the immediate return of the Crown Prince to Europe.

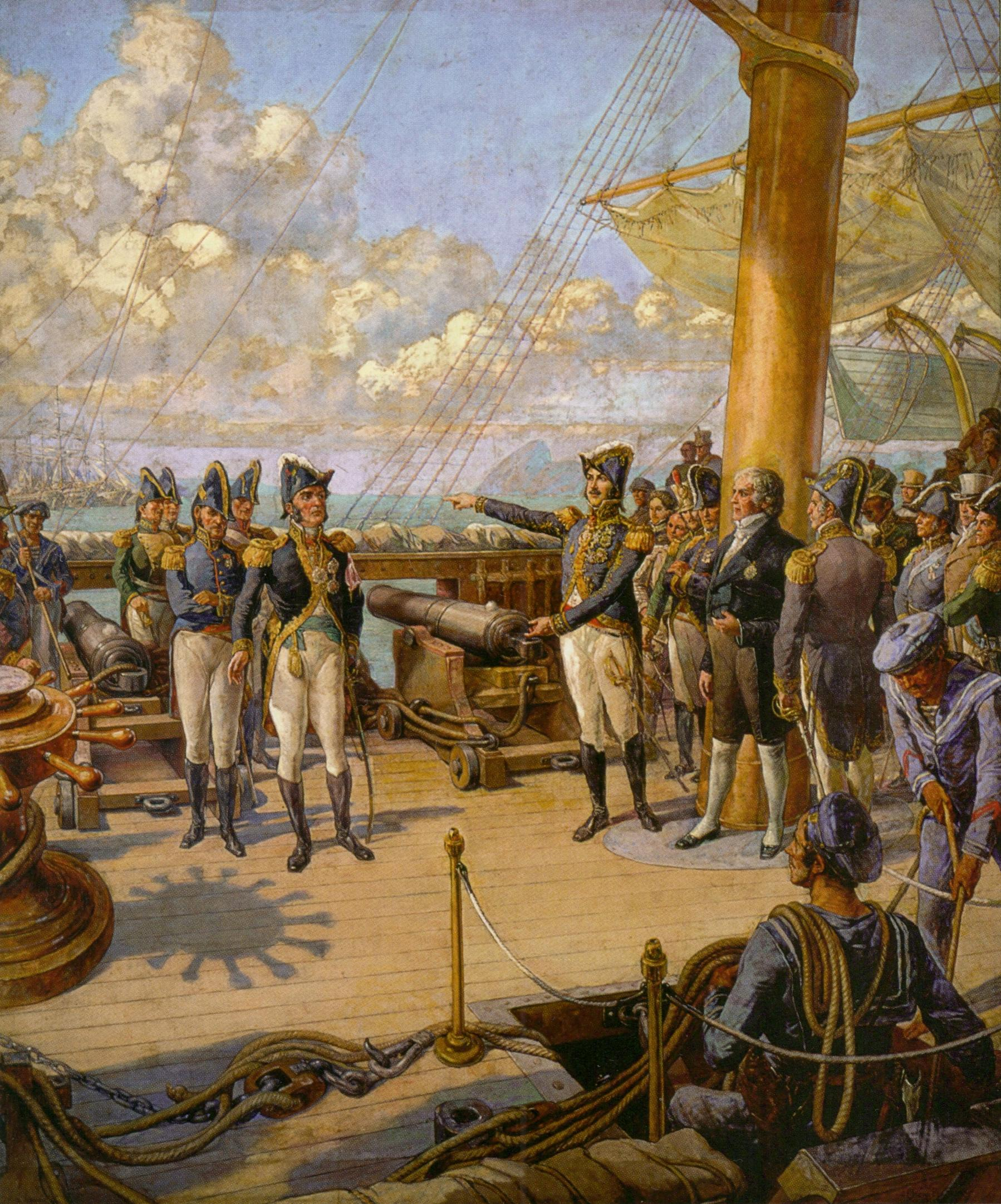
Pedro, then Prince Regent of the Kingdom of Brazil, orders officer Jorge d'Avillez to return to Portugal after his unsuccessful rebellion, February 1822

Brazilian Nationalists reacted, interpreting the actions of the Cortes as an attempt to "divide and conquer". They alleged that once the provisions approved by the Cortes were enacted and enforced, Brazil, although formally remaining a part of the transatlantic monarchy, would be in reality returned to the condition of a Colony. Brazilians feared the breakup of Brazil, with the creation of provinces directly subject to the Lisbon Government.

Also, language in the draft Constitution that would have the effect of including colonies of the Portuguese colonial empire in Africa and Asia as part of the territory of the United Kingdom seemed to confirm that the intention of the Cortes was indeed to reduce Brazil to the position of a colony once again: it was clear that the territories in Africa and Asia would continue to be colonies, and to be subject to economic exploitation and domination by means of restrictions in foreign trade, etc.; but those colonies would now be declared parts of the United Kingdom, meaning that, with the inclusion of the whole of the Portuguese Empire in the United Kingdom, the definition of the United Kingdom itself would change: the United Kingdom would cease to correspond to a transatlantic State that included no colonies but that controlled colonies overseas, and would instead become a State that included colonies in its bosom. This would provide the legal framework for the reintroduction of trade restrictions in Brazil that had been lifted since the arrival of the Royal Family in Brazilian shores.

Notably, several Portuguese politicians wanted to re-introduce to Brazil restrictions in foreign trade that in the previous colonial era had been dubbed euphemistically as the colonial pact: a mercantilist system in which Brazilian products could only be exported to Portugal, and in which Brazilians could only import products from Portugal. This system, which enabled the economic exploitation of the Portuguese Colonies by Metropolitan Portugal, had been abolished in Brazil even before the creation of the United Kingdom. Indeed, the abolition of all the restrictions on foreign trade, and the exclusion of Brazil from the imperialist policy of the colonial pact, had taken place already in 1808, as soon as the Royal Family arrived in Brazil: the first act signed by the Prince Regent after his arrival in Brazil was the decree on the opening of the Brazilian ports to friendly Nations, that enabled Brazilians to import goods from Nations other than Portugal, and to export Brazilian products to the foreign Nations maintaining diplomatic ties with the Portuguese Empire. Now, with the measures being voted by the Cortes assembled in Lisbon, that economic freedom was under threat.

Faced with that scenario, Brazilian independentists managed to convince Prince Pedro to stay in Brazil against the orders of the Cortes, that demanded his immediate return. He thus continued leading a central Brazilian Government as Regent, and further established that no laws, decrees or instructions issued by the Portuguese Cortes or by the central government of the United Kingdom would be obeyed in Brazil without his fiat.

The Prince's decision not to obey the decrees of the Cortes that demanded this return, and instead to stay in Brazil as its Regent was solemnly announced on 9 January 1822, in reply to a formal petition from the city council of Rio de Janeiro. In February 1822 Prince Pedro decided to create an advisory council, composed of representatives elected to represent the several provinces of Brazil, summoning elections to that council. Its first meeting was held on 2 June 1822. Prince Regent Pedro's decree to the effect that laws, decrees and orders from Lisbon would only be carried out in Brazil with his fiat was published in May 1822.

By agreeing to defy the Cortes and stay in Brazil, Prince Pedro assumed the leadership of the Brazilian cause; as a recognition of his leading role, Brazilian independentists offered Pedro on 13 May 1822 the title of "Perpetual Protector and Defender of Brazil"; he rejected the title of Protector, arguing that Brazil did not need one, but assumed the title of "Perpetual Defender of Brazil". By defying explicit orders that demanded his return to Europe, Pedro escalated the events that would lead to the separation of Brazil from the United Kingdom, and hastened the crucial moment of the Proclamation of Independence. As the situation between Brazilians and Portuguese deteriorated, the United Kingdom was doomed to dissolution.

Brazilian independentists argued that Brazil's future should be decided by Brazilians and not by the Lisbon Cortes, and they accordingly demanded the summoning of a National Constituent Assembly for Brazil, separate from the Constituent Cortes assembled in Portugal. Prince Pedro, acting on the advice of his newly convened Council, embraced those demands, and issued a decree on 13 June 1822 summoning elections for a Brazilian Constituent Assembly. Due to the further escalation of tensions between Brazil and Portugal, the elections to that Constituent Assembly would only take place after the Prince himself had proclaimed the independence of Brazil (the Assembly would only convene in 1823, and the independence of Brazil was declared in September 1822, with the establishment of the Empire of Brazil in October 1822).

The Cortes sent troops to Brazil to compel the dissolution of the Prince's Government and to force his return to Portugal as ordered, but, on arrival those troops were commanded by the Prince to return to Portugal. The Portuguese troops in Rio de Janeiro obeyed the Prince Royal and returned to Europe, but in other Provinces fighting erupted between Brazilians and Portuguese.

==== Proclamation of Independence ====
Declaration of Brazil's independence by Prince Pedro on 7 September 1822

News of further attempts of the Portuguese Cortes aimed at dissolving Prince Pedro's Regency led directly to the Brazilian Proclamation of Independence. Accordingly, in 1822, the Regent of the Kingdom of Brazil, Prince Pedro, the son of John VI, declared the independence of Brazil, as a reaction against the attempts of the Cortes to terminate Brazilian home rule, and became Emperor Pedro I of Brazil, which spelled the end of the United Kingdom.

The independence of Brazil was proclaimed by Prince Pedro on 7 September 1822. The Proclamation of Independence was made while the Prince was in the Province of São Paulo. He had travelled there to secure the Province's loyalty to the Brazilian cause. He departed the city of São Paulo, the Province's capital, on 5 September, and on 7 September, while on his way back to Rio de Janeiro, he received mail from his Minister José Bonifácio de Andrada e Silva and from his wife, Princess Leopoldina (who remained in Rio de Janeiro presiding over the Ministry during Prince Pedro's absence), informing Pedro of further acts by the Cortes aimed at dissolving his Government by force, insisting on his return to Lisbon and attempting to void his later acts as Regent of the Kingdom of Brazil. It was clear that independence was the only option left. Pedro turned to his companions that included his Guard of Honour and spoke: "Friends, the Portuguese Cortes want to enslave and pursue us. From today on our relations are broken. No ties can unite us anymore" and continued after he pulled out his blue-white armband that symbolized Portugal: "Armbands off, soldiers. Hail to the independence, to freedom and to the separation of Brazil from Portugal!" He unsheathed his sword affirming that "For my blood, my honour, my God, I swear to give Brazil freedom," and later cried out: "Independence or death!". This event is remembered as "Cry of Ipiranga", because it took place next to the riverbank of the Ipiranga brook. The Prince then decided to return urgently to the city of São Paulo, where he and his entourage arrived in the night of 7 September. There, they announced the news of the Prince's Proclamation, and of Brazil's separation from Portugal, and were met with great popular acclaim.

Less than a month later, on 23 September 1822, the Lisbon Cortes, still unaware of the Brazilian declaration of independence, approved the Constitution of the United Kingdom, that was then signed by the members of the Cortes and presented to the King. Between 23 September and 1 October, the members of the Cortes, including Brazilians that still took part in its deliberations, took oaths to uphold the Constitution. In a solemnity on 1 October 1822, King John VI appeared before the Cortes, made a speech from the Throne declaring his acceptance of the Constitution, swore an oath to uphold it, and signed an instrument of assent that was included in the text of the Constitution after the signatures of the members of the Cortes, declaring that the king had accepted the Constitution and sworn to abide by it. On 4 October, acting as the Cortes had directed, the Portuguese King signed at the Royal Palace of Queluz a Charter of Law promulgating the text of the Constitution and ordering its execution by all his subjects throughout the United Kingdom. This Charter of Law, containing the full text of the Constitution, including the signatures of the members of the Cortes and the King's instrument of assent, was published on the following day, 5 October 1822. Due to the Brazilian secession from the United Kingdom, that Constitution was never recognized in Brazil and was only effective in Portugal.

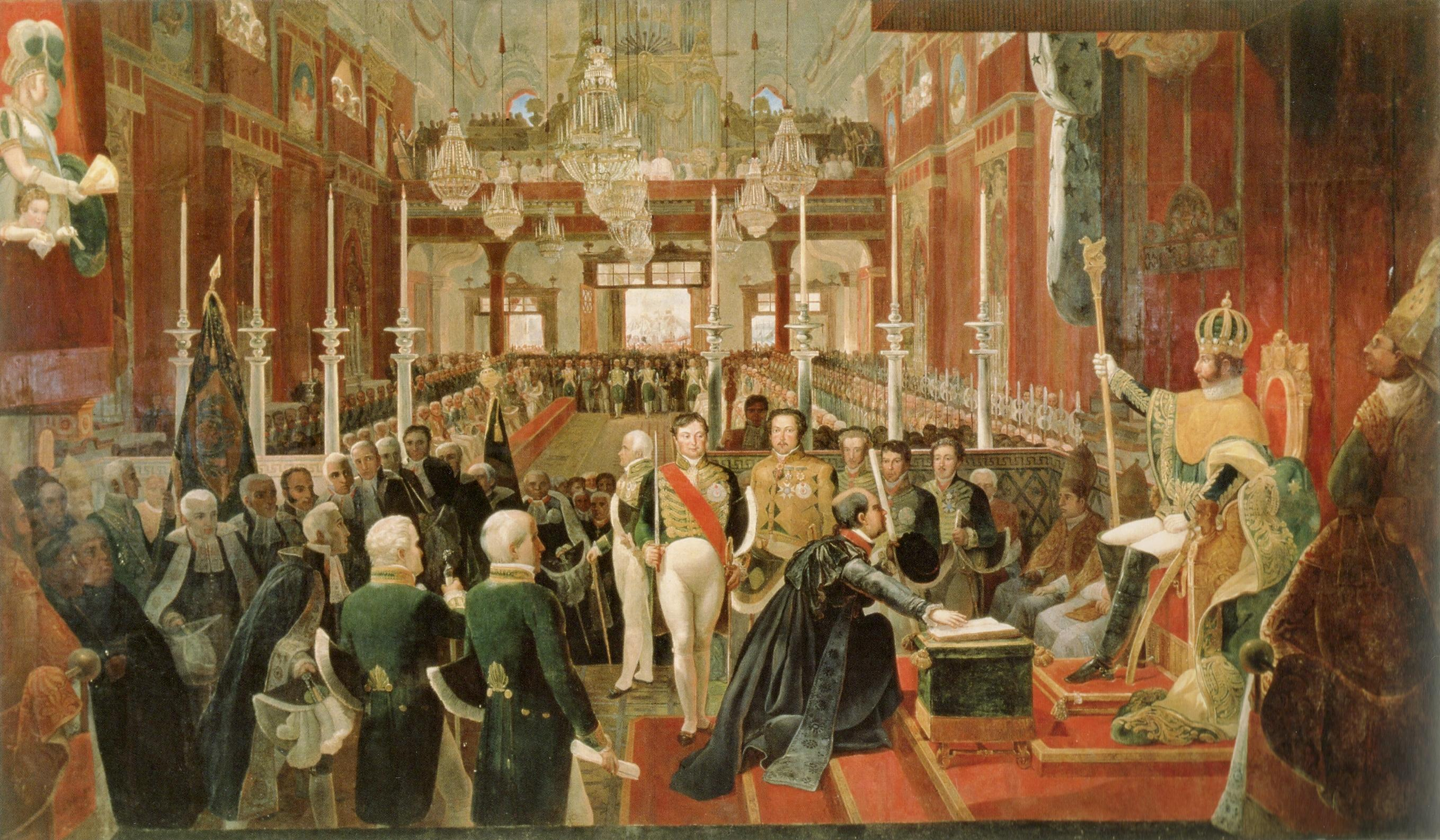
Coronation ceremony of Pedro I as the first Emperor of Brazil on 1 December 1822

That the newly independent Brazilian Nation would adopt a constitutional monarchy as its form of Government and that Prince Pedro would be the new State's monarch were obvious facts to all the leaders involved in the process of Brazilian emancipation, but still, for a little more than one month after the 7 September 1822 Proclamation of Independence, Prince Pedro initially continued to use the title of Prince Regent, as he did not want to declare himself monarch, preferring instead to accept the new country's Crown as an offer. This led several local councils to adopt motions and addresses asking the Prince Regent to assume the title of King, or of Emperor (there were no legislatures in the provinces, and also no national legislature existed at that time; the municipal councils were the only existing legislatures, and since the colonial era they had substantial authority). The municipal council of the city of Rio de Janeiro and the other municipal councils of the province of Rio de Janeiro then organized a ceremony of acclamation, with the support of the Prince Regent's Government. The municipal council of Rio de Janeiro voted to instruct its president to offer Prince Pedro the title of Emperor. Then, the Prince's Advisory Council, a body that was not a legislative assembly, but was composed of councillors elected from all Provinces of Brazil to represent its peoples and advise the Prince Regent (the Conselho de Procuradores das Províncias do Brasil or Council of the Representatives of the Provinces of Brazil), advised the Prince Regent to accede to the several requests already presented and to assume the imperial title. On 12 October 1822, Prince Pedro accepted the offer of the new Brazilian Throne and was acclaimed the first Emperor of the independent Empire of Brazil.

Although Portuguese monarchs were not crowned since the 16th century, it was decided by the newly created imperial Government that the Brazilian monarchy, then recently instituted, should adopt different customs, both to differentiate itself from the Portuguese model and to highlight its status as a distinct institution, from a separate and independent country. Thus, it was decided that Emperors of Brazil should be consecrated, anointed and crowned with the full Catholic coronation ritual. Also, in the context of the struggle to sustain the newly declared independence of Brazil, and to seek recognition for the Empire, the religious act of coronation would establish Emperor Pedro I as an anointed monarch, crowned by the Catholic Church. It was regarded that this could improve his legitimacy in the eyes of other Christian monarchies, and it would also confirm the alliance between the newly declared State and the Church in Brazil. Accordingly, the coronation of Emperor Pedro I took place on 1 December 1822.

==== Recognition of independence ====
The Brazilian declaration of independence and foundation of the Empire of Brazil led to a War of Independence. The Portuguese initially refused to recognize Brazil as a sovereign state, treating the whole affair as a rebellion and attempting to preserve the United Kingdom. However, military action was never close to Rio de Janeiro, and the main battles of the independence war took place in the Northeastern region of Brazil. The independentist Brazilian forces overpowered the Portuguese forces as well as the few local forces that were still loyal to Portugal, and the last Portuguese troops surrendered in November 1823. Compared to the wars of independence waged by Spanish colonies during the decolonization of the Americas, the Brazilian Independence War did not result in significant bloodshed, although land and naval battles were fought.

The Portuguese military defeat, however, was not followed by swift recognition of the new country's independence. Instead, from 1822 to 1825 the Portuguese Government engaged in heavy diplomatic efforts to avoid the recognition of Brazil's independence by the European Powers, invoking the principles of the Congress of Vienna and subsequent European alliances. Those foreign Nations, however, were keen on establishing trade and diplomatic ties with Brazil. Under British pressure, Portugal eventually agreed to recognize Brazil's independence in 1825, thus allowing the new country to establish diplomatic ties with other European powers shortly thereafter.

In 1824, in the wake of the adoption of the Constitution of the Empire of Brazil on 25 March that year, the United States of America became the first nation to recognize the independence of Brazil and the consequential disbandment of the United Kingdom.

Portugal recognized the sovereignty of Brazil only in 1825. Since a coup d'etát on 3 June 1823 the Portuguese King John VI had already abolished the Constitution of 1822 and dissolved the Cortes, thus reversing the Liberal Revolution of 1820. On 4 January 1824 King John VI issued a Charter of Law confirming as in force the "traditional laws of the Portuguese Monarchy", thus ratifying the restoration of the absolutist régime in Portugal.

There were two Portuguese acts of recognition of Brazilian independence. The first was unilateral and purporting to be constitutive of such independence, the second was bilateral and declaratory.

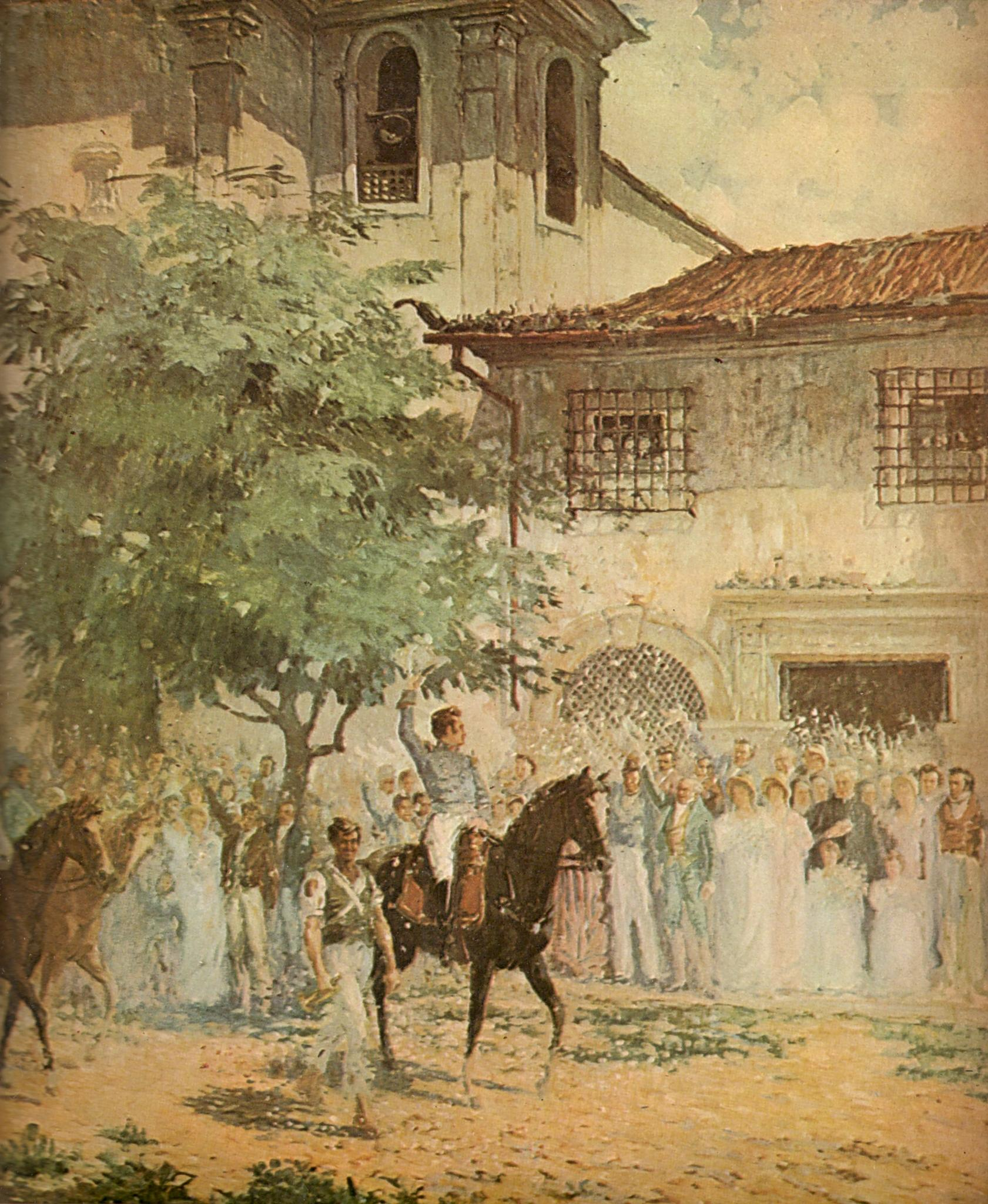
The Imperial Army entering Salvador after the surrender of Portuguese forces in 1823

The first act of recognition was materialized in Letters Patent issued on 13 May 1825, by which the Portuguese King "voluntarily ceded and transferred the sovereignty" over Brazil to his son, the Brazilian Emperor, and thus recognized, as a result of this concession, Brazil as an "Independent Empire, separate from the Kingdoms of Portugal and Algarves".

The second act of recognition was materialized in a Treaty of Peace signed in Rio de Janeiro on 29 August 1825, by means of which Portugal again recognized the independence of Brazil. This Treaty was ratified by the Emperor of Brazil on 30 August 1825, and by the King of Portugal on 15 November 1825, and entered into force in international Law also on 15 November 1825 upon the exchange of the instruments of ratification in Lisbon. On the same date of the signature of the Portuguese instrument of ratification and of the exchange of the ratification documents between the representatives of the two Nations, the Portuguese King also signed a Charter of Law, a statute, ordering the execution of the Treaty as part of the domestic Law of Portugal. The Treaty was incorporated as part of the domestic Law of Brazil by a Decree of Emperor Pedro I signed on 10 April 1826.

The reason why there were two separate acts of recognition of the independence of Brazil is this: in the wake of the Brazilian victory in the War of Independence, the Portuguese king initially attempted to recognize Brazilian independence unilaterally so as to ignore the fact of the Portuguese defeat and transmit the impression that Portugal was being magnanimous. By means of such unilateral concession, Portugal intended to avoid the humiliation of Peace negotiations with its former Colony. King John VI wanted to "save face" by giving the impression that Portugal was voluntarily conceding independence to Brazil, and not just recognizing a fait accompli. Thus the Letters Patent issued on 13 May 1825 ignored the proclamation of 1822 and "granted independence to Brazil" as if it were a concession, that was laced with conditions. Thus, Brazilian independence would result not from the events of 1822, but from the 1825 Letters Patent.

In the 13 May 1825 Letters Patent, King John recited the polity creating acts of his predecessors and of other sovereigns of Europe, recited his own desire to promote the happiness of all the peoples over which he ruled, and proceeded to declare and enact that from thenceforth the Kingdom of Brazil would be an Empire, and that the Empire of Brazil would be separate from the Kingdoms of Portugal and the Algarves in both internal and foreign affairs; that he, John, therefore took for himself the title of Emperor of Brazil and King of Portugal and the Algarves, to which would follow the other titles of the Portuguese Crown; that the title of "Prince or Princess Imperial of Brazil, and Royal of Portugal and the Algarves" would be vested in the heir or heiress presumptive of the imperial and royal Crowns; that since the succession of both the imperial and royal Crowns belonged to his son, "Prince Dom Pedro", he, King John, at once, "by this same act and letters patent", ceded and transferred to Pedro, from thenceforth, of his "own free will", the full sovereignty of the Empire of Brazil, for Pedro to govern it, assuming at once the title Emperor of Brazil, keeping at the same time the title of Prince Royal of Portugal and the Algarves, while John reserved for himself the same title of Emperor, and the position of King of Portugal and the Algarves, with the full sovereignty of the said Kingdoms (of Portugal and the Algarves).

However, such unilateral, constitutive recognition was not accepted by Brazilians, who demanded a declarative recognition of the independence as proclaimed and existing since 1822. The new Brazilian Government therefore made the establishment of peaceful relations and diplomatic ties with Portugal conditional on the signature of a bilateral treaty between the two Nations. Portugal eventually agreed, and a treaty to that effect was signed with British mediation. The treaty between the Empire of Brazil and the Kingdom of Portugal on the recognition of Brazilian independence, signed in Rio de Janeiro on 29 August 1825, finally entered into force on 15 November 1825 upon the exchange of the instruments of ratification in Lisbon.

The Portuguese, however, only accepted to sign the Independence treaty on condition that Brazil agreed to pay reparations for the properties of the Portuguese State that were seized by the new Brazilian State. Brazil desperately needed to establish normal diplomatic relations with Portugal, because other European Monarchies had already made clear that they would only recognize the Empire of Brazil after the establishment of normal relations between Brazil and Portugal. Thus, by a separate convention that was signed on the same occasion as the Treaty on the Recognition of Independence, Brazil agreed to pay Portugal two million pounds in damages. The British, who had mediated the peace negotiations, granted Brazil a loan of the same value, so that Brazil could pay the agreed sum. As a result of this agreement, Brazil was able to achieve universal international recognition, both de facto and de jure as an independent State.

Upon recognizing the independence of Brazil from the United Kingdom of Portugal, Brazil and Algarves, King John VI, by his charter of law of 15 November 1825 changed back the name of the Portuguese State and the Royal Titles to "Kingdom of Portugal" and "King of Portugal and the Algarves" respectively. The title of the Portuguese heir apparent was changed to "Prince Royal of Portugal and the Algarves" by the same edict.

The recognition of Brazilian independence completed the dissolution of the United Kingdom. By a provision of the Letters Patent of 13 May 1825, confirmed by the Treaty on the Recognition of Independence in spite of the secession of Brazil from the Portuguese Monarchy, the Portuguese King, John VI, was allowed to use for the remainder of his life the honorary title of "Emperor of Brazil", with the caveat that this title was honorary and ceremonial only, and that Pedro I and his successors in the independent Brazilian Crown were the only actual Emperors of Brazil. This honorary title ceased to have effect upon the demise of King John VI on 10 March 1826.

News of the separate convention appended to the Independence Treaty, by which Brazil agreed to pay Portugal financial compensation, angered many Brazilians, who saw this payment as a result of a bad negotiation, especially in view of the Brazilian military victory in the independence war. The grant of the honorary imperial title to the Portuguese King was also not popular with Brazilians. Furthermore, the declaratory language of the Independence Treaty was sufficiently ambiguous, so that Brazilians could claim that the independence declared in 1822 was being recognized, but mention was also made of the 13 May 1825 Letters Patent, so that the Portuguese could claim that the recognition was based on the previous concession. The preamble of the treaty mentioned the concession made by means of the Letters Patent of 13 May 1825; it stated that, by that Letters Patent, the Portuguese King had "recognized Brazil as an independent Empire, and his son Dom Pedro as Emperor", but also stated that, in so doing, the Portuguese monarch was "ceding and transferring of his free will the sovereignty of the said Empire". In the treaty's second article, it was the Brazilian Emperor who agreed that his father, the Portuguese King, should take for himself the honorary life title of Emperor. In the first article of the treaty it was declared that the King of Portugal recognized Brazil as an independent Empire, and as a Nation separate from the Kingdoms of Portugal and the Algarves, and also recognized his son Dom Pedro as Emperor of Brazil, ceding "of his own free will" to the Brazilian Emperor and his legitimate successors all claims of sovereignty over Brazil. Peace was established between the countries of Brazil and Portugal by the fourth Article.

In spite of the unpopular clauses, and especially of the harsh financial agreement, Brazilian Emperor Pedro I agreed to ratify the treaty negotiated with Portugal as he was keen on resolving the recognition of independence question before the opening of the first legislative session of the Brazilian Parliament (Assembléia Geral or General Assembly) elected under the Constitution adopted in 1824. The first meeting of the new Legislature was set to take place on 3 May 1826, and after a brief delay, that Parliament was indeed opened on 6 May 1826. By that time, the independence question was indeed resolved, as the Independence treaty had been ratified in November 1825 and as the Emperor, still yielding the fullness of legislative authority (that he was to lose upon the first meeting of the Parliament), ordered the execution of the agreement as part of the law of Brazil on 10 April 1826.

==== Aftermath: resolution of the dynastic entanglement ====
With the death of the Portuguese King John VI on 10 March 1826, his heir apparent, Brazilian Emperor Pedro I, inherited the Portuguese Crown, and reigned briefly as King Pedro IV. On 20 March 1826 the proclamation of the Brazilian Emperor's accession to the Portuguese Throne was made public by the Portuguese Council of Regency (that had been instituted by King John VI during his final illness, and that was led by the Infanta Isabel Maria, daughter of John VI and Pedro I & IV's sister). With this union of Crowns, the monarchies of Portugal and Brazil were once again briefly united, but there was no thought of a reunification of the two separate States. Accordingly, this brief union of Crowns in the person of Pedro I and IV remained always a personal union only, and not a real union or a rebirth of the United Kingdom.

News of the death of King John VI and of the proclamation of the Brazilian Emperor as King of Portugal reached the Brazilian province of Bahia on 18 April, and official news to that effect reached the Emperor of Brazil and new King of Portugal in Rio de Janeiro on 24 April 1826, shortly after the final settlement of the Brazilian independence question (the decree publishing the text of the Treaty on the Recognition of Independence and ordering its execution as part of the Law of Brazil had just been made public on 10 April 1826). The existence even of the personal union only was seen by Brazilian politicians as dangerous, since it could come to affect the effectiveness of the newly formed country's sovereignty.

Accordingly, steps were taken to put an end to the personal union: Pedro I & IV agreed to abdicate the Portuguese Throne in favour of his eldest daughter, but he also wanted to ensure that her rights would be respected, and he further wanted to restore constitutional monarchy to Portugal. In order to put an end to the Portuguese absolute monarchy, the King-Emperor commissioned the drafting of a new Constitution for Portugal, that was widely based on the Brazilian Constitution. This document was finalized in less than a week.

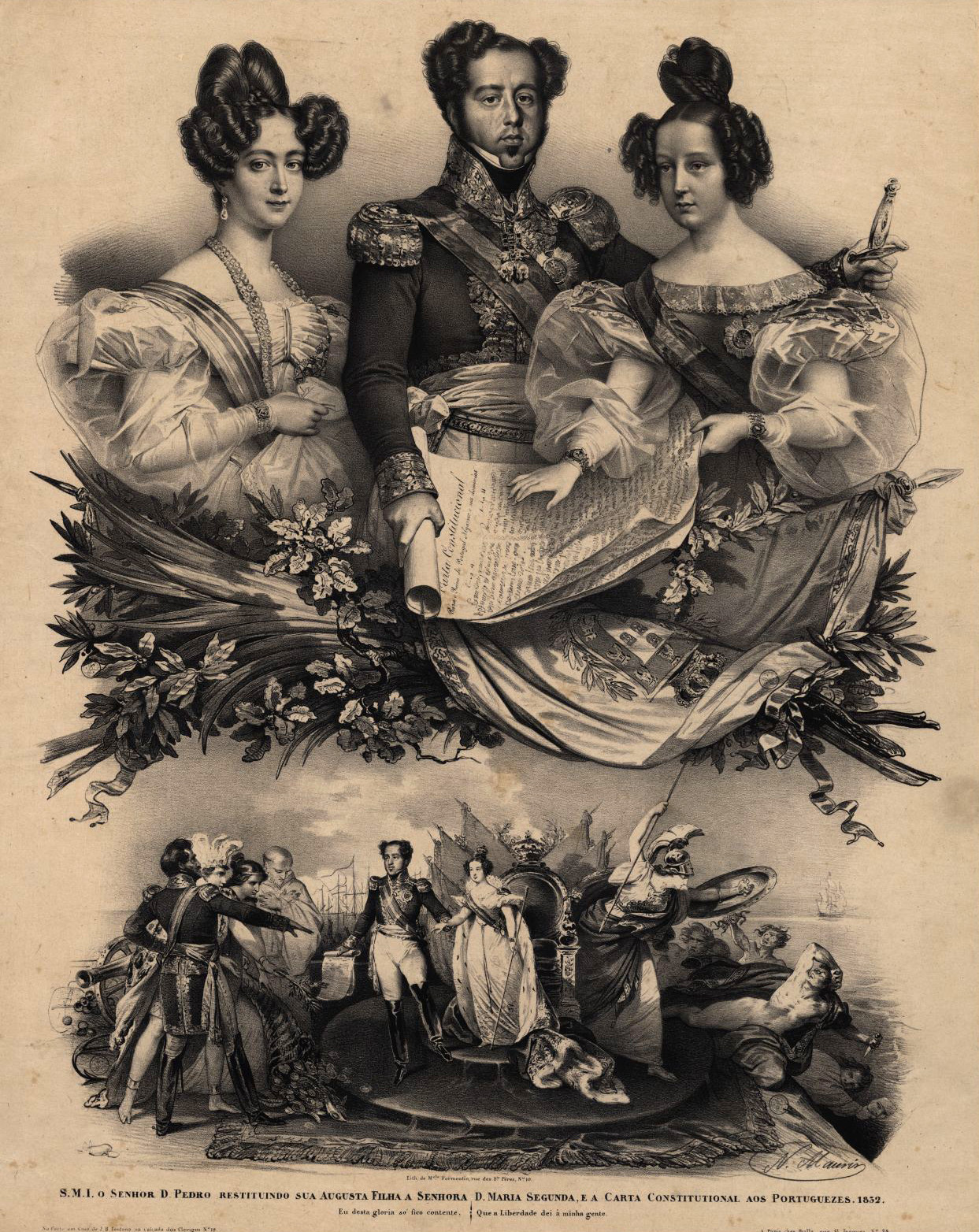
The King-Emperor with his daughter Queen Maria II (right) and his wife Amélie on the frontispiece of the 1826 Portuguese Constitution

After issuing a new Constitution for Portugal on 29 April 1826, and as already announced in that Constitution, King-Emperor Pedro abdicated the Portuguese Crown in favour of his daughter, Princess Maria da Glória, on 2 May 1826. Princess Maria da Glória thus became Queen Maria II of Portugal. The document by which the Brazilian Emperor abdicated the Portuguese Crown was signed days before the first meeting of the Parliament established by the Brazilian Constitution of 1824, that assembled for the first time on 6 May 1826. Before his abdication, on 26 April, King Pedro confirmed the Regency of Portugal that had been established by his father during his final illness, and that was led by the Infanta Isabel Maria, his sister. As the new Queen Maria II was still a minor, Portugal would need to be led by Regents during her minority. On 30 April, King Pedro IV set the date for the first legislative elections under the new Portuguese Constitution and appointed Peers of the Realm.

On 12 May 1826, British envoy Charles Stuart left Rio de Janeiro for Portugal carrying with him the acts signed by the Brazilian Emperor as King of Portugal, including the new Portuguese Constitution and his deed of abdication of the Portuguese Crown. On that same date Carlos Matias Pereira left Rio de Janeiro for Lisbon in another ship carrying a second copy of the same documents. Charles Stuart arrived in Lisbon on 2 July 1826 and presented the acts signed by King Pedro IV to the Government of Portugal, including his original deed of abdication of the Portuguese Throne. On 12 July 1826 the Portuguese Government published the new Constitution decreed by Pedro IV; the Portuguese Regency swore on 31 July 1826 an oath to uphold the Constitution, marking its entry into force, and, on 1 August 1826 Queen Maria II was publicly proclaimed as Queen of Portugal, with the Infanta Isabel Maria as Regent. On 4 October the exiled infante Miguel (that had been exiled since attempting to depose his father, and that would later usurp the Portuguese Crown, leading to the Portuguese Civil War of 1828–1834) took in Vienna an oath of allegiance to Queen Maria II and the Constitution. The first Portuguese Cortes to meet under the Constitution were elected on 8 October, and the opening of Parliament took place on 30 October 1826.

Although Pedro's abdication of the Portuguese Crown to Maria II was provided for even in the Constitution issued on 29 April 1826, the original deed of abdication, signed on 2 May 1826 contained conditions; however, those conditions were subsequently waived, as the abdication was later declared final, irrevocable, accomplished and fully effective by a decree issued by Pedro on 3 March 1828, just a few months before Infante Miguel's usurpation of the Throne and the start of the Portuguese Civil War (in accordance with a decree issued on 3 September 1827, Infante Miguel replaced Infanta Isabel Maria as Regent of Portugal on 26 February 1828, and he initially agreed to govern in the name of the Queen, but on 7 July 1828 he had himself proclaimed King with retroactive effect, assuming the title of Miguel I; Maria II would only be restored to the Throne in 1834, at the conclusion of the Civil War). In any event, Pedro's unconditional confirmation of his abdication reinforced the impossibility of a new union between Portugal and Brazil.

Pedro's abdication of the Portuguese Throne led to the separation of the Brazilian and Portuguese monarchies, since the Portuguese Crown was inherited by Queen Maria II and her successors, and the Brazilian Crown came to be inherited by Pedro I's Brazilian heir apparent, Prince Pedro de Alcantara, who would become the future Emperor Pedro II of Brazil. Prince Pedro de Alcantara had no rights to the Portuguese Crown because, having been born in Brazil on 2 December 1825, after the Portuguese recognition of the independence of Brazil, he was not a Portuguese national and under the Portuguese Constitution and Laws a foreigner could not inherit the Portuguese Crown.

Still, with Princess Maria da Glória's accession to the Throne of Portugal as Queen Maria II in 1826, the question arose, about whether she should still be regarded as a Brazilian Princess with a place in the order of succession, or whether article 119 of Brazil's Constitution (that prohibited foreigners from succeeding to the Crown) applied to her, so that, as a foreigner, she should be considered excluded from the Brazilian line of succession. The Empire's Constitution limited the Crown of Brazil to Emperor Pedro I and his legitimate descendants, under a male-preference cognatic primogeniture system, but it rendered foreigners incapable of succeeding to the Crown, and it empowered the General Assembly, the Empire's Parliament, to settle any doubts regarding the rights of succession to the Crown. The issue of Queen Maria II's status in the Brazilian line of succession became more pressing once Emperor Pedro II acceded to the Brazilian Throne as a minor in 1831, since the question was no longer only about whether or not the Queen of Portugal had a place in the Brazilian line of succession, but it had now become a question about whether or not she was the heiress presumptive to the Brazilian Crown, that is, the first person in line to succeed to the Brazilian Throne, occupied by her brother Emperor Pedro II. Thus, the Brazilian Parliament had to settle the matter and decide who was the first person in line to the Brazilian Throne, with the corresponding title of Princess Imperial: Queen Maria II of Portugal or Princess Januária of Brazil. Both were minors under Brazilian Law, and since no one in the Brazilian Imperial Family was of age, the Regency of the Empire was discharged by politicians chosen by the General Assembly in accordance with the Constitution. However, the question was all important because, in the event that Emperor Pedro II died before producing descendants, the Crown of the independent Empire of Brazil could end up coming to the Queen of Portugal, thus recreating a personal union between the two monarchies. The question became even more pressing after the conclusion of the Portuguese Civil War (1828-1834), won by Maria II and her liberal supporters in 1834: Maria's uncle, the absolutist claimant Dom Miguel (who had deposed Maria in 1828), was defeated, surrendered his claim to the Portuguese Throne in the Concession of Evoramonte, Maria was restored to the Throne and her constitutional government, now recognized by all foreign Powers as the legitimate one, assumed control of the whole of Portugal. Although the doubt about which of the two Princesses was Emperor Pedro II's heiress presumptive had existed since the abdication of the Brazilian Crown by Pedro I in 1831, Maria II was at the time a deposed Queen, although actively pursuing her claim to the Throne of Portugal. With her victory in the Portuguese Civil War, however, she once again became an actually reigning monarch, and, for the whole Brazilian political establishment, the fact that a foreign Sovereign was heiress presumptive to the Brazilian Crown was highly worrying, as it was seen as detrimental to the independence of the recently established Brazilian Nation. The Regency and Parliament of Brazil wanted to avoid any possibility of a personal union with Portugal being recreated, so as to secure the independence of Brazil. In order to settle that question, the Brazilian General Assembly adopted a statute, signed into law by the Regent on behalf of Emperor Pedro II on 30 October 1835, declaring Queen Maria II of Portugal had lost her succession rights to the Crown of Brazil, due to her condition as a foreigner, so that she and her descendants were excluded from the Brazilian line of succession; ruling that Princess Januária and her descendants were therefore first in line to the Throne after Emperor Pedro II and his descendants, and decreeing that, accordingly, Princess Januária, as the then heiress presumptive of the Brazilian Crown, should be recognized as Princess Imperial.

Thus, the abdication of the Portuguese Crown by Brazilian Emperor Pedro I terminated the brief 1826 personal union and separated the monarchies of Portugal and Brazil, and that abdication, coupled with the exclusion of the new Portuguese Queen, Maria II, from the Brazilian line of succession, broke the last remaining ties of political union between the two Nations, securing the preservation of the independence of Brazil and putting to an end all hopes of the rebirth of a Luso-Brazilian United Kingdom.

== Monarchs of the United Kingdom of Portugal, Brazil and the Algarves ==
Name	Lifespan	Reign start	Reign end	Notes	Family	Image
Maria I	17 December 1734 – 20 March 1816 (aged 81)	16 December 1815	20 March 1816	Brazil elevated to the status of kingdom united with Portugal	Braganza	Queen Maria I
John VI	13 May 1767 – 10 March 1826 (aged 58)	20 March 1816	7 September 1822	Son of Maria I	Braganza	King John VI

== See also ==
- Empire of Brazil
- Empire
- First reign
- History of Portugal (1777–1834)
- Kingdom of Brazil
- Kingdom of Portugal
- Kingdom of the Algarve
- Portuguese Empire
- Realm
